

360001–360100 

|-bgcolor=#d6d6d6
| 360001 ||  || — || September 15, 2006 || Kitt Peak || Spacewatch || — || align=right | 2.8 km || 
|-id=002 bgcolor=#E9E9E9
| 360002 ||  || — || May 7, 2002 || Palomar || NEAT || MAR || align=right | 1.7 km || 
|-id=003 bgcolor=#E9E9E9
| 360003 ||  || — || July 5, 2003 || Kitt Peak || Spacewatch || — || align=right | 1.4 km || 
|-id=004 bgcolor=#E9E9E9
| 360004 ||  || — || March 24, 2006 || Kitt Peak || Spacewatch || — || align=right | 1.2 km || 
|-id=005 bgcolor=#E9E9E9
| 360005 ||  || — || December 21, 2003 || Kitt Peak || Spacewatch || — || align=right | 2.2 km || 
|-id=006 bgcolor=#d6d6d6
| 360006 ||  || — || September 17, 2006 || Kitt Peak || Spacewatch || CHA || align=right | 3.3 km || 
|-id=007 bgcolor=#d6d6d6
| 360007 ||  || — || May 9, 2005 || Kitt Peak || Spacewatch || — || align=right | 3.2 km || 
|-id=008 bgcolor=#E9E9E9
| 360008 || 2012 YR || — || September 12, 2007 || Dauban || C. Rinner, F. Kugel || GEF || align=right | 1.3 km || 
|-id=009 bgcolor=#fefefe
| 360009 ||  || — || February 12, 1999 || Socorro || LINEAR || — || align=right | 1.1 km || 
|-id=010 bgcolor=#E9E9E9
| 360010 ||  || — || October 21, 2007 || Mount Lemmon || Mount Lemmon Survey || — || align=right | 1.7 km || 
|-id=011 bgcolor=#fefefe
| 360011 ||  || — || April 17, 1998 || Kitt Peak || Spacewatch || — || align=right data-sort-value="0.91" | 910 m || 
|-id=012 bgcolor=#d6d6d6
| 360012 ||  || — || January 9, 2002 || Socorro || LINEAR || — || align=right | 3.8 km || 
|-id=013 bgcolor=#E9E9E9
| 360013 ||  || — || March 18, 2004 || Kitt Peak || Spacewatch || XIZ || align=right | 1.6 km || 
|-id=014 bgcolor=#fefefe
| 360014 ||  || — || December 2, 2008 || Kitt Peak || Spacewatch || SUL || align=right | 2.3 km || 
|-id=015 bgcolor=#fefefe
| 360015 ||  || — || October 29, 2005 || Catalina || CSS || FLO || align=right data-sort-value="0.67" | 670 m || 
|-id=016 bgcolor=#E9E9E9
| 360016 ||  || — || February 12, 2004 || Kitt Peak || Spacewatch || — || align=right | 3.0 km || 
|-id=017 bgcolor=#d6d6d6
| 360017 ||  || — || February 10, 2002 || Socorro || LINEAR || — || align=right | 3.9 km || 
|-id=018 bgcolor=#E9E9E9
| 360018 ||  || — || November 19, 2003 || Anderson Mesa || LONEOS || — || align=right | 1.7 km || 
|-id=019 bgcolor=#d6d6d6
| 360019 ||  || — || January 5, 2003 || Socorro || LINEAR || — || align=right | 2.9 km || 
|-id=020 bgcolor=#fefefe
| 360020 ||  || — || February 2, 2006 || Kitt Peak || Spacewatch || ERI || align=right | 2.5 km || 
|-id=021 bgcolor=#E9E9E9
| 360021 ||  || — || July 13, 2001 || Palomar || NEAT || — || align=right | 2.6 km || 
|-id=022 bgcolor=#fefefe
| 360022 ||  || — || January 30, 2003 || Kitt Peak || Spacewatch || — || align=right data-sort-value="0.67" | 670 m || 
|-id=023 bgcolor=#E9E9E9
| 360023 ||  || — || February 20, 2002 || Kitt Peak || Spacewatch || — || align=right | 3.2 km || 
|-id=024 bgcolor=#fefefe
| 360024 ||  || — || December 20, 2001 || Palomar || NEAT || — || align=right | 1.0 km || 
|-id=025 bgcolor=#d6d6d6
| 360025 ||  || — || February 10, 2002 || Kitt Peak || Spacewatch || — || align=right | 3.9 km || 
|-id=026 bgcolor=#fefefe
| 360026 ||  || — || April 26, 2003 || Kitt Peak || Spacewatch || — || align=right data-sort-value="0.62" | 620 m || 
|-id=027 bgcolor=#d6d6d6
| 360027 ||  || — || January 30, 2008 || Mount Lemmon || Mount Lemmon Survey || — || align=right | 2.5 km || 
|-id=028 bgcolor=#fefefe
| 360028 ||  || — || October 28, 2005 || Kitt Peak || Spacewatch || — || align=right data-sort-value="0.69" | 690 m || 
|-id=029 bgcolor=#fefefe
| 360029 ||  || — || December 27, 2005 || Kitt Peak || Spacewatch || — || align=right data-sort-value="0.73" | 730 m || 
|-id=030 bgcolor=#fefefe
| 360030 ||  || — || November 1, 2005 || Mount Lemmon || Mount Lemmon Survey || FLO || align=right | 1.6 km || 
|-id=031 bgcolor=#C2FFFF
| 360031 ||  || — || January 26, 2010 || WISE || WISE || L4ERY || align=right | 11 km || 
|-id=032 bgcolor=#fefefe
| 360032 ||  || — || October 10, 2008 || Mount Lemmon || Mount Lemmon Survey || FLO || align=right data-sort-value="0.68" | 680 m || 
|-id=033 bgcolor=#fefefe
| 360033 ||  || — || March 13, 2002 || Socorro || LINEAR || — || align=right data-sort-value="0.92" | 920 m || 
|-id=034 bgcolor=#fefefe
| 360034 ||  || — || February 22, 2006 || Anderson Mesa || LONEOS || — || align=right data-sort-value="0.86" | 860 m || 
|-id=035 bgcolor=#fefefe
| 360035 ||  || — || September 3, 2008 || Kitt Peak || Spacewatch || — || align=right | 1.1 km || 
|-id=036 bgcolor=#E9E9E9
| 360036 ||  || — || May 31, 2006 || Mount Lemmon || Mount Lemmon Survey || — || align=right | 1.9 km || 
|-id=037 bgcolor=#d6d6d6
| 360037 ||  || — || September 24, 2011 || Haleakala || Pan-STARRS || EOS || align=right | 2.1 km || 
|-id=038 bgcolor=#d6d6d6
| 360038 ||  || — || April 16, 2010 || WISE || WISE || NAE || align=right | 3.2 km || 
|-id=039 bgcolor=#fefefe
| 360039 ||  || — || December 10, 2005 || Kitt Peak || Spacewatch || MAS || align=right data-sort-value="0.85" | 850 m || 
|-id=040 bgcolor=#d6d6d6
| 360040 ||  || — || April 7, 2003 || Kitt Peak || Spacewatch || — || align=right | 3.8 km || 
|-id=041 bgcolor=#C2FFFF
| 360041 ||  || — || October 20, 2012 || Mount Lemmon || Mount Lemmon Survey || L4 || align=right | 9.6 km || 
|-id=042 bgcolor=#E9E9E9
| 360042 ||  || — || February 2, 2000 || Socorro || LINEAR || — || align=right | 4.3 km || 
|-id=043 bgcolor=#E9E9E9
| 360043 ||  || — || January 8, 1999 || Kitt Peak || Spacewatch || AST || align=right | 2.4 km || 
|-id=044 bgcolor=#fefefe
| 360044 ||  || — || October 12, 1998 || Kitt Peak || Spacewatch || — || align=right data-sort-value="0.51" | 510 m || 
|-id=045 bgcolor=#fefefe
| 360045 ||  || — || May 1, 2006 || Kitt Peak || Spacewatch || NYS || align=right data-sort-value="0.83" | 830 m || 
|-id=046 bgcolor=#E9E9E9
| 360046 ||  || — || March 29, 2009 || Siding Spring || SSS || — || align=right | 2.9 km || 
|-id=047 bgcolor=#C2FFFF
| 360047 ||  || — || December 26, 2000 || Kitt Peak || Spacewatch || L4 || align=right | 12 km || 
|-id=048 bgcolor=#d6d6d6
| 360048 ||  || — || February 3, 2008 || Kitt Peak || Spacewatch || — || align=right | 3.4 km || 
|-id=049 bgcolor=#d6d6d6
| 360049 ||  || — || January 24, 1996 || Kitt Peak || Spacewatch || — || align=right | 5.4 km || 
|-id=050 bgcolor=#E9E9E9
| 360050 ||  || — || April 10, 2000 || Socorro || LINEAR || — || align=right | 2.2 km || 
|-id=051 bgcolor=#E9E9E9
| 360051 ||  || — || January 22, 2004 || Socorro || LINEAR || — || align=right | 2.4 km || 
|-id=052 bgcolor=#fefefe
| 360052 ||  || — || December 10, 2005 || Catalina || CSS || — || align=right | 3.2 km || 
|-id=053 bgcolor=#fefefe
| 360053 ||  || — || January 29, 1998 || Kitt Peak || Spacewatch || — || align=right data-sort-value="0.79" | 790 m || 
|-id=054 bgcolor=#d6d6d6
| 360054 ||  || — || January 10, 2008 || Mount Lemmon || Mount Lemmon Survey || — || align=right | 2.9 km || 
|-id=055 bgcolor=#fefefe
| 360055 ||  || — || August 10, 2007 || Kitt Peak || Spacewatch || — || align=right data-sort-value="0.92" | 920 m || 
|-id=056 bgcolor=#E9E9E9
| 360056 ||  || — || June 20, 2006 || Mount Lemmon || Mount Lemmon Survey || WIT || align=right | 1.3 km || 
|-id=057 bgcolor=#C2FFFF
| 360057 ||  || — || July 8, 2007 || Lulin Observatory || LUSS || L4 || align=right | 12 km || 
|-id=058 bgcolor=#C2FFFF
| 360058 ||  || — || November 14, 1998 || Kitt Peak || Spacewatch || L4 || align=right | 9.0 km || 
|-id=059 bgcolor=#d6d6d6
| 360059 ||  || — || March 11, 2008 || Catalina || CSS || URS || align=right | 5.7 km || 
|-id=060 bgcolor=#d6d6d6
| 360060 ||  || — || February 4, 1997 || Kitt Peak || Spacewatch || — || align=right | 2.7 km || 
|-id=061 bgcolor=#fefefe
| 360061 ||  || — || January 27, 2003 || Socorro || LINEAR || — || align=right data-sort-value="0.75" | 750 m || 
|-id=062 bgcolor=#fefefe
| 360062 ||  || — || April 4, 2002 || Palomar || NEAT || — || align=right data-sort-value="0.94" | 940 m || 
|-id=063 bgcolor=#fefefe
| 360063 ||  || — || March 11, 2000 || Socorro || LINEAR || FLO || align=right data-sort-value="0.63" | 630 m || 
|-id=064 bgcolor=#C2FFFF
| 360064 ||  || — || April 5, 2002 || Palomar || NEAT || L4 || align=right | 10 km || 
|-id=065 bgcolor=#E9E9E9
| 360065 ||  || — || December 4, 2007 || Catalina || CSS || — || align=right | 1.7 km || 
|-id=066 bgcolor=#E9E9E9
| 360066 ||  || — || February 29, 2000 || Socorro || LINEAR || — || align=right | 2.4 km || 
|-id=067 bgcolor=#E9E9E9
| 360067 ||  || — || March 11, 2000 || Anderson Mesa || LONEOS || JUN || align=right | 1.2 km || 
|-id=068 bgcolor=#d6d6d6
| 360068 ||  || — || November 21, 2006 || Mount Lemmon || Mount Lemmon Survey || — || align=right | 6.0 km || 
|-id=069 bgcolor=#d6d6d6
| 360069 ||  || — || November 7, 2007 || Mount Lemmon || Mount Lemmon Survey || — || align=right | 4.4 km || 
|-id=070 bgcolor=#C2FFFF
| 360070 ||  || — || October 28, 2010 || Mount Lemmon || Mount Lemmon Survey || L4 || align=right | 9.5 km || 
|-id=071 bgcolor=#C2FFFF
| 360071 ||  || — || September 4, 2008 || Kitt Peak || Spacewatch || L4 || align=right | 8.1 km || 
|-id=072 bgcolor=#C2FFFF
| 360072 Alcimedon ||  ||  || September 2, 2008 || Zelenchukskaya || Zelenchukskaya Stn. || L4ERY || align=right | 10 km || 
|-id=073 bgcolor=#C2FFFF
| 360073 ||  || — || December 28, 2000 || Kitt Peak || Spacewatch || L4 || align=right | 13 km || 
|-id=074 bgcolor=#d6d6d6
| 360074 ||  || — || February 11, 2002 || Socorro || LINEAR || — || align=right | 3.2 km || 
|-id=075 bgcolor=#C2FFFF
| 360075 ||  || — || October 1, 2009 || Mount Lemmon || Mount Lemmon Survey || L4 || align=right | 11 km || 
|-id=076 bgcolor=#C2FFFF
| 360076 ||  || — || May 30, 2003 || Cerro Tololo || M. W. Buie || L4ERY || align=right | 7.5 km || 
|-id=077 bgcolor=#C2FFFF
| 360077 ||  || — || November 12, 2010 || Mount Lemmon || Mount Lemmon Survey || L4 || align=right | 8.3 km || 
|-id=078 bgcolor=#d6d6d6
| 360078 ||  || — || May 11, 2003 || Kitt Peak || Spacewatch || — || align=right | 7.0 km || 
|-id=079 bgcolor=#C2FFFF
| 360079 ||  || — || July 29, 2008 || Kitt Peak || Spacewatch || L4ERY || align=right | 8.6 km || 
|-id=080 bgcolor=#fefefe
| 360080 ||  || — || May 21, 2006 || Kitt Peak || Spacewatch || NYS || align=right data-sort-value="0.82" | 820 m || 
|-id=081 bgcolor=#FA8072
| 360081 ||  || — || August 19, 2001 || Socorro || LINEAR || H || align=right data-sort-value="0.85" | 850 m || 
|-id=082 bgcolor=#E9E9E9
| 360082 ||  || — || July 24, 2003 || Palomar || NEAT || — || align=right | 1.4 km || 
|-id=083 bgcolor=#E9E9E9
| 360083 ||  || — || January 14, 1999 || Kitt Peak || Spacewatch || — || align=right | 2.8 km || 
|-id=084 bgcolor=#d6d6d6
| 360084 ||  || — || September 13, 2004 || Kitt Peak || Spacewatch || — || align=right | 3.9 km || 
|-id=085 bgcolor=#E9E9E9
| 360085 ||  || — || January 30, 2004 || Kitt Peak || Spacewatch || WIT || align=right | 1.3 km || 
|-id=086 bgcolor=#d6d6d6
| 360086 ||  || — || April 1, 2003 || Apache Point || SDSS || EOS || align=right | 2.4 km || 
|-id=087 bgcolor=#E9E9E9
| 360087 ||  || — || December 28, 2003 || Kitt Peak || Spacewatch || WIT || align=right | 1.2 km || 
|-id=088 bgcolor=#C2FFFF
| 360088 ||  || — || February 10, 2002 || Socorro || LINEAR || L4 || align=right | 8.6 km || 
|-id=089 bgcolor=#E9E9E9
| 360089 ||  || — || August 17, 2006 || Palomar || NEAT || HNS || align=right | 1.5 km || 
|-id=090 bgcolor=#d6d6d6
| 360090 ||  || — || July 4, 2005 || Mount Lemmon || Mount Lemmon Survey || — || align=right | 3.1 km || 
|-id=091 bgcolor=#fefefe
| 360091 ||  || — || February 9, 2002 || Kitt Peak || Spacewatch || MAS || align=right data-sort-value="0.89" | 890 m || 
|-id=092 bgcolor=#d6d6d6
| 360092 ||  || — || February 12, 2002 || Kitt Peak || Spacewatch || — || align=right | 2.5 km || 
|-id=093 bgcolor=#C2FFFF
| 360093 ||  || — || September 13, 2007 || Mount Lemmon || Mount Lemmon Survey || L4 || align=right | 8.8 km || 
|-id=094 bgcolor=#E9E9E9
| 360094 ||  || — || May 10, 2005 || Kitt Peak || Spacewatch || NEM || align=right | 2.3 km || 
|-id=095 bgcolor=#E9E9E9
| 360095 ||  || — || November 20, 2003 || Kitt Peak || M. W. Buie || — || align=right data-sort-value="0.84" | 840 m || 
|-id=096 bgcolor=#d6d6d6
| 360096 ||  || — || April 7, 2003 || Kitt Peak || Spacewatch || — || align=right | 4.0 km || 
|-id=097 bgcolor=#fefefe
| 360097 ||  || — || January 21, 2002 || Kitt Peak || Spacewatch || ERI || align=right | 2.0 km || 
|-id=098 bgcolor=#fefefe
| 360098 ||  || — || October 9, 2007 || Kitt Peak || Spacewatch || — || align=right | 2.4 km || 
|-id=099 bgcolor=#E9E9E9
| 360099 ||  || — || February 12, 2004 || Kitt Peak || Spacewatch || — || align=right | 2.8 km || 
|-id=100 bgcolor=#C2FFFF
| 360100 ||  || — || May 8, 2005 || Kitt Peak || Spacewatch || L4 || align=right | 10 km || 
|}

360101–360200 

|-bgcolor=#fefefe
| 360101 ||  || — || May 24, 2003 || Kitt Peak || Spacewatch || FLO || align=right data-sort-value="0.90" | 900 m || 
|-id=102 bgcolor=#fefefe
| 360102 ||  || — || January 31, 1995 || Kitt Peak || Spacewatch || — || align=right data-sort-value="0.85" | 850 m || 
|-id=103 bgcolor=#C2FFFF
| 360103 ||  || — || November 1, 2008 || Mount Lemmon || Mount Lemmon Survey || L4 || align=right | 13 km || 
|-id=104 bgcolor=#fefefe
| 360104 ||  || — || April 8, 2010 || Mount Lemmon || Mount Lemmon Survey || V || align=right data-sort-value="0.87" | 870 m || 
|-id=105 bgcolor=#E9E9E9
| 360105 ||  || — || April 26, 2010 || Mount Lemmon || Mount Lemmon Survey || — || align=right | 1.2 km || 
|-id=106 bgcolor=#fefefe
| 360106 ||  || — || May 25, 2006 || Mauna Kea || P. A. Wiegert || MAS || align=right data-sort-value="0.71" | 710 m || 
|-id=107 bgcolor=#C2FFFF
| 360107 ||  || — || January 17, 2010 || WISE || WISE || L4 || align=right | 12 km || 
|-id=108 bgcolor=#E9E9E9
| 360108 ||  || — || November 5, 2007 || Mount Lemmon || Mount Lemmon Survey || — || align=right | 2.4 km || 
|-id=109 bgcolor=#E9E9E9
| 360109 ||  || — || March 25, 2009 || Mount Lemmon || Mount Lemmon Survey || — || align=right | 3.3 km || 
|-id=110 bgcolor=#d6d6d6
| 360110 ||  || — || February 7, 2002 || Palomar || NEAT || THM || align=right | 2.4 km || 
|-id=111 bgcolor=#E9E9E9
| 360111 ||  || — || March 18, 2004 || Kitt Peak || Spacewatch || AGN || align=right | 1.1 km || 
|-id=112 bgcolor=#d6d6d6
| 360112 ||  || — || August 1, 2005 || Siding Spring || SSS || — || align=right | 2.4 km || 
|-id=113 bgcolor=#fefefe
| 360113 ||  || — || February 12, 2002 || Kitt Peak || Spacewatch || — || align=right data-sort-value="0.94" | 940 m || 
|-id=114 bgcolor=#E9E9E9
| 360114 ||  || — || September 21, 2001 || Kitt Peak || Spacewatch || XIZ || align=right | 1.6 km || 
|-id=115 bgcolor=#fefefe
| 360115 ||  || — || November 21, 2005 || Kitt Peak || Spacewatch || — || align=right data-sort-value="0.57" | 570 m || 
|-id=116 bgcolor=#fefefe
| 360116 ||  || — || April 11, 2003 || Kitt Peak || Spacewatch || — || align=right data-sort-value="0.92" | 920 m || 
|-id=117 bgcolor=#d6d6d6
| 360117 ||  || — || November 11, 2006 || Kitt Peak || Spacewatch || VER || align=right | 3.5 km || 
|-id=118 bgcolor=#fefefe
| 360118 ||  || — || September 20, 2003 || Kitt Peak || Spacewatch || — || align=right data-sort-value="0.99" | 990 m || 
|-id=119 bgcolor=#fefefe
| 360119 ||  || — || February 7, 2002 || Palomar || NEAT || NYS || align=right data-sort-value="0.58" | 580 m || 
|-id=120 bgcolor=#E9E9E9
| 360120 ||  || — || September 19, 2006 || Kitt Peak || Spacewatch || AGN || align=right | 1.3 km || 
|-id=121 bgcolor=#d6d6d6
| 360121 ||  || — || October 23, 2006 || Kitt Peak || Spacewatch || — || align=right | 2.8 km || 
|-id=122 bgcolor=#d6d6d6
| 360122 ||  || — || April 7, 2003 || Kitt Peak || Spacewatch || — || align=right | 3.0 km || 
|-id=123 bgcolor=#E9E9E9
| 360123 ||  || — || September 26, 2006 || Kitt Peak || Spacewatch || HOF || align=right | 2.9 km || 
|-id=124 bgcolor=#fefefe
| 360124 ||  || — || September 11, 2004 || Kitt Peak || Spacewatch || MAS || align=right data-sort-value="0.68" | 680 m || 
|-id=125 bgcolor=#d6d6d6
| 360125 ||  || — || March 21, 1998 || Kitt Peak || Spacewatch || — || align=right | 2.8 km || 
|-id=126 bgcolor=#fefefe
| 360126 ||  || — || April 30, 2006 || Kitt Peak || Spacewatch || — || align=right | 1.1 km || 
|-id=127 bgcolor=#E9E9E9
| 360127 ||  || — || March 27, 2004 || Anderson Mesa || LONEOS || DOR || align=right | 2.8 km || 
|-id=128 bgcolor=#d6d6d6
| 360128 ||  || — || April 1, 2003 || Apache Point || SDSS || — || align=right | 3.3 km || 
|-id=129 bgcolor=#E9E9E9
| 360129 ||  || — || June 20, 2010 || Mount Lemmon || Mount Lemmon Survey || — || align=right | 2.1 km || 
|-id=130 bgcolor=#fefefe
| 360130 ||  || — || August 22, 1995 || Kitt Peak || Spacewatch || — || align=right data-sort-value="0.77" | 770 m || 
|-id=131 bgcolor=#E9E9E9
| 360131 ||  || — || February 16, 1996 || Caussols || E. W. Elst || — || align=right | 2.9 km || 
|-id=132 bgcolor=#d6d6d6
| 360132 ||  || — || February 13, 2002 || Kitt Peak || Spacewatch || — || align=right | 3.0 km || 
|-id=133 bgcolor=#fefefe
| 360133 ||  || — || August 29, 2000 || Socorro || LINEAR || H || align=right data-sort-value="0.96" | 960 m || 
|-id=134 bgcolor=#E9E9E9
| 360134 ||  || — || February 2, 2000 || Socorro || LINEAR || — || align=right | 2.5 km || 
|-id=135 bgcolor=#E9E9E9
| 360135 ||  || — || March 16, 2005 || Catalina || CSS || — || align=right | 1.3 km || 
|-id=136 bgcolor=#E9E9E9
| 360136 ||  || — || April 5, 2005 || Catalina || CSS || ADE || align=right | 2.2 km || 
|-id=137 bgcolor=#E9E9E9
| 360137 ||  || — || October 7, 2002 || Kitt Peak || Spacewatch || — || align=right | 1.9 km || 
|-id=138 bgcolor=#fefefe
| 360138 ||  || — || October 10, 1993 || La Silla || E. W. Elst || ERI || align=right | 1.6 km || 
|-id=139 bgcolor=#d6d6d6
| 360139 ||  || — || February 10, 2002 || Socorro || LINEAR || — || align=right | 4.2 km || 
|-id=140 bgcolor=#E9E9E9
| 360140 ||  || — || December 5, 2007 || Kitt Peak || Spacewatch || — || align=right | 2.8 km || 
|-id=141 bgcolor=#d6d6d6
| 360141 ||  || — || October 1, 2005 || Kitt Peak || Spacewatch || — || align=right | 3.5 km || 
|-id=142 bgcolor=#fefefe
| 360142 ||  || — || October 25, 2000 || Socorro || LINEAR || NYS || align=right data-sort-value="0.78" | 780 m || 
|-id=143 bgcolor=#C2FFFF
| 360143 ||  || — || October 26, 2009 || Kitt Peak || Spacewatch || L4 || align=right | 8.1 km || 
|-id=144 bgcolor=#E9E9E9
| 360144 ||  || — || January 31, 2004 || Kitt Peak || Spacewatch || — || align=right | 1.8 km || 
|-id=145 bgcolor=#E9E9E9
| 360145 ||  || — || November 22, 1995 || Kitt Peak || Spacewatch || — || align=right | 1.2 km || 
|-id=146 bgcolor=#E9E9E9
| 360146 ||  || — || February 11, 2004 || Kitt Peak || Spacewatch || WIT || align=right data-sort-value="0.90" | 900 m || 
|-id=147 bgcolor=#d6d6d6
| 360147 ||  || — || December 15, 2001 || Socorro || LINEAR || — || align=right | 3.1 km || 
|-id=148 bgcolor=#fefefe
| 360148 ||  || — || March 10, 2006 || Siding Spring || SSS || PHO || align=right | 1.5 km || 
|-id=149 bgcolor=#fefefe
| 360149 ||  || — || September 4, 2008 || Kitt Peak || Spacewatch || — || align=right data-sort-value="0.84" | 840 m || 
|-id=150 bgcolor=#fefefe
| 360150 ||  || — || January 9, 2002 || Kitt Peak || Spacewatch || NYS || align=right data-sort-value="0.79" | 790 m || 
|-id=151 bgcolor=#d6d6d6
| 360151 ||  || — || September 17, 2004 || Kitt Peak || Spacewatch || 7:4 || align=right | 3.7 km || 
|-id=152 bgcolor=#fefefe
| 360152 ||  || — || October 22, 2008 || Kitt Peak || Spacewatch || FLO || align=right data-sort-value="0.71" | 710 m || 
|-id=153 bgcolor=#E9E9E9
| 360153 ||  || — || August 21, 2006 || Kitt Peak || Spacewatch || — || align=right | 1.9 km || 
|-id=154 bgcolor=#d6d6d6
| 360154 ||  || — || February 4, 2000 || Kitt Peak || Spacewatch || 7:4 || align=right | 4.3 km || 
|-id=155 bgcolor=#fefefe
| 360155 ||  || — || January 27, 2006 || Kitt Peak || Spacewatch || — || align=right data-sort-value="0.85" | 850 m || 
|-id=156 bgcolor=#E9E9E9
| 360156 ||  || — || February 12, 2004 || Kitt Peak || Spacewatch || — || align=right | 2.8 km || 
|-id=157 bgcolor=#fefefe
| 360157 ||  || — || November 17, 2008 || Kitt Peak || Spacewatch || — || align=right | 1.4 km || 
|-id=158 bgcolor=#fefefe
| 360158 ||  || — || May 17, 2010 || Kitt Peak || Spacewatch || V || align=right data-sort-value="0.73" | 730 m || 
|-id=159 bgcolor=#d6d6d6
| 360159 ||  || — || October 21, 1995 || Kitt Peak || Spacewatch || — || align=right | 2.7 km || 
|-id=160 bgcolor=#C2FFFF
| 360160 ||  || — || September 28, 2008 || Mount Lemmon || Mount Lemmon Survey || L4 || align=right | 10 km || 
|-id=161 bgcolor=#d6d6d6
| 360161 ||  || — || December 27, 2006 || Mount Lemmon || Mount Lemmon Survey || HYG || align=right | 3.6 km || 
|-id=162 bgcolor=#C2FFFF
| 360162 ||  || — || November 11, 2009 || Catalina || CSS || L4 || align=right | 12 km || 
|-id=163 bgcolor=#d6d6d6
| 360163 ||  || — || May 27, 2010 || WISE || WISE || — || align=right | 3.0 km || 
|-id=164 bgcolor=#E9E9E9
| 360164 ||  || — || September 12, 2007 || Catalina || CSS || EUN || align=right | 1.2 km || 
|-id=165 bgcolor=#fefefe
| 360165 ||  || — || December 29, 2005 || Kitt Peak || Spacewatch || FLO || align=right data-sort-value="0.58" | 580 m || 
|-id=166 bgcolor=#E9E9E9
| 360166 ||  || — || September 16, 1998 || Kitt Peak || Spacewatch || — || align=right | 1.0 km || 
|-id=167 bgcolor=#d6d6d6
| 360167 ||  || — || January 13, 2002 || Socorro || LINEAR || — || align=right | 3.1 km || 
|-id=168 bgcolor=#E9E9E9
| 360168 ||  || — || November 9, 1993 || Kitt Peak || Spacewatch || — || align=right | 1.9 km || 
|-id=169 bgcolor=#E9E9E9
| 360169 ||  || — || March 17, 2004 || Kitt Peak || Spacewatch || HEN || align=right | 1.1 km || 
|-id=170 bgcolor=#E9E9E9
| 360170 ||  || — || January 16, 2008 || Mount Lemmon || Mount Lemmon Survey || — || align=right | 2.6 km || 
|-id=171 bgcolor=#C2FFFF
| 360171 ||  || — || September 22, 2008 || Mount Lemmon || Mount Lemmon Survey || L4 || align=right | 11 km || 
|-id=172 bgcolor=#E9E9E9
| 360172 ||  || — || May 15, 2005 || Palomar || NEAT || — || align=right | 3.2 km || 
|-id=173 bgcolor=#d6d6d6
| 360173 ||  || — || October 23, 2001 || Socorro || LINEAR || CHA || align=right | 2.4 km || 
|-id=174 bgcolor=#fefefe
| 360174 ||  || — || April 23, 1995 || Kitt Peak || Spacewatch || — || align=right | 1.1 km || 
|-id=175 bgcolor=#fefefe
| 360175 ||  || — || October 7, 2004 || Anderson Mesa || LONEOS || — || align=right | 2.2 km || 
|-id=176 bgcolor=#fefefe
| 360176 ||  || — || April 14, 2002 || Kitt Peak || Spacewatch || — || align=right data-sort-value="0.94" | 940 m || 
|-id=177 bgcolor=#E9E9E9
| 360177 ||  || — || August 18, 2006 || Kitt Peak || Spacewatch || HNA || align=right | 2.9 km || 
|-id=178 bgcolor=#fefefe
| 360178 ||  || — || March 27, 2003 || Palomar || NEAT || — || align=right data-sort-value="0.76" | 760 m || 
|-id=179 bgcolor=#fefefe
| 360179 ||  || — || October 6, 2004 || Kitt Peak || Spacewatch || — || align=right data-sort-value="0.97" | 970 m || 
|-id=180 bgcolor=#C2FFFF
| 360180 ||  || — || September 12, 2007 || Mount Lemmon || Mount Lemmon Survey || L4 || align=right | 11 km || 
|-id=181 bgcolor=#d6d6d6
| 360181 ||  || — || October 23, 2005 || Palomar || NEAT || — || align=right | 3.7 km || 
|-id=182 bgcolor=#fefefe
| 360182 ||  || — || March 18, 2002 || Kitt Peak || Spacewatch || V || align=right data-sort-value="0.76" | 760 m || 
|-id=183 bgcolor=#fefefe
| 360183 ||  || — || September 10, 2007 || Mount Lemmon || Mount Lemmon Survey || V || align=right data-sort-value="0.69" | 690 m || 
|-id=184 bgcolor=#fefefe
| 360184 ||  || — || January 26, 2006 || Catalina || CSS || PHO || align=right | 1.2 km || 
|-id=185 bgcolor=#C2FFFF
| 360185 ||  || — || September 29, 2009 || Mount Lemmon || Mount Lemmon Survey || L4 || align=right | 9.5 km || 
|-id=186 bgcolor=#fefefe
| 360186 ||  || — || November 25, 2005 || Mount Lemmon || Mount Lemmon Survey || FLO || align=right data-sort-value="0.63" | 630 m || 
|-id=187 bgcolor=#fefefe
| 360187 ||  || — || December 28, 2005 || Kitt Peak || Spacewatch || — || align=right data-sort-value="0.77" | 770 m || 
|-id=188 bgcolor=#d6d6d6
| 360188 ||  || — || August 29, 2005 || Kitt Peak || Spacewatch || — || align=right | 2.9 km || 
|-id=189 bgcolor=#E9E9E9
| 360189 ||  || — || March 17, 2005 || Catalina || CSS || — || align=right | 2.2 km || 
|-id=190 bgcolor=#fefefe
| 360190 ||  || — || September 11, 2007 || Kitt Peak || Spacewatch || — || align=right data-sort-value="0.98" | 980 m || 
|-id=191 bgcolor=#FFC2E0
| 360191 || 1988 TA || — || October 5, 1988 || Palomar || J. Phinney, J. E. Mueller || APOPHAcritical || align=right data-sort-value="0.4" | 400 m || 
|-id=192 bgcolor=#FFC2E0
| 360192 || 1991 FB || — || March 18, 1991 || Siding Spring || R. H. McNaught || AMO || align=right data-sort-value="0.58" | 580 m || 
|-id=193 bgcolor=#E9E9E9
| 360193 ||  || — || September 17, 1995 || Kitt Peak || Spacewatch || — || align=right data-sort-value="0.97" | 970 m || 
|-id=194 bgcolor=#d6d6d6
| 360194 ||  || — || September 20, 1995 || Kitt Peak || Spacewatch || — || align=right | 2.9 km || 
|-id=195 bgcolor=#d6d6d6
| 360195 ||  || — || October 19, 1995 || Kitt Peak || Spacewatch || BRA || align=right | 1.5 km || 
|-id=196 bgcolor=#E9E9E9
| 360196 ||  || — || July 14, 1996 || Haleakala || NEAT || JUN || align=right | 1.4 km || 
|-id=197 bgcolor=#E9E9E9
| 360197 ||  || — || October 12, 1996 || Kitt Peak || Spacewatch || HOF || align=right | 2.6 km || 
|-id=198 bgcolor=#E9E9E9
| 360198 ||  || — || September 30, 1997 || Kitt Peak || Spacewatch || HEN || align=right | 1.1 km || 
|-id=199 bgcolor=#E9E9E9
| 360199 ||  || — || September 30, 1997 || Kitt Peak || Spacewatch || MAR || align=right | 1.3 km || 
|-id=200 bgcolor=#FA8072
| 360200 ||  || — || October 26, 1997 || Goodricke-Pigott || R. A. Tucker || — || align=right | 3.7 km || 
|}

360201–360300 

|-bgcolor=#E9E9E9
| 360201 ||  || — || November 21, 1997 || Kitt Peak || Spacewatch || — || align=right | 2.1 km || 
|-id=202 bgcolor=#fefefe
| 360202 ||  || — || November 29, 1997 || Kitt Peak || Spacewatch || FLO || align=right data-sort-value="0.70" | 700 m || 
|-id=203 bgcolor=#fefefe
| 360203 ||  || — || February 23, 1998 || Kitt Peak || Spacewatch || — || align=right data-sort-value="0.81" | 810 m || 
|-id=204 bgcolor=#d6d6d6
| 360204 ||  || — || September 20, 1998 || Kitt Peak || Spacewatch || ALA || align=right | 4.4 km || 
|-id=205 bgcolor=#d6d6d6
| 360205 ||  || — || September 23, 1998 || Kitt Peak || Spacewatch || EOS || align=right | 1.7 km || 
|-id=206 bgcolor=#d6d6d6
| 360206 ||  || — || September 20, 1998 || La Silla || E. W. Elst || MEL || align=right | 6.0 km || 
|-id=207 bgcolor=#E9E9E9
| 360207 ||  || — || October 13, 1998 || Kitt Peak || Spacewatch || — || align=right | 1.2 km || 
|-id=208 bgcolor=#E9E9E9
| 360208 ||  || — || November 10, 1998 || Caussols || ODAS || — || align=right | 1.9 km || 
|-id=209 bgcolor=#FA8072
| 360209 ||  || — || November 19, 1998 || Kitt Peak || Spacewatch || — || align=right data-sort-value="0.61" | 610 m || 
|-id=210 bgcolor=#E9E9E9
| 360210 ||  || — || November 24, 1998 || Kitt Peak || Spacewatch || — || align=right | 2.0 km || 
|-id=211 bgcolor=#FA8072
| 360211 ||  || — || February 10, 1999 || Socorro || LINEAR || — || align=right | 2.3 km || 
|-id=212 bgcolor=#E9E9E9
| 360212 ||  || — || March 21, 1999 || Apache Point || SDSS || — || align=right | 2.3 km || 
|-id=213 bgcolor=#d6d6d6
| 360213 ||  || — || August 13, 1999 || Kitt Peak || Spacewatch || — || align=right | 3.3 km || 
|-id=214 bgcolor=#fefefe
| 360214 ||  || — || August 12, 1999 || Kitt Peak || Spacewatch || NYS || align=right data-sort-value="0.74" | 740 m || 
|-id=215 bgcolor=#d6d6d6
| 360215 ||  || — || September 5, 1999 || Kitt Peak || Spacewatch || — || align=right | 3.1 km || 
|-id=216 bgcolor=#d6d6d6
| 360216 ||  || — || September 7, 1999 || Socorro || LINEAR || Tj (2.94) || align=right | 4.0 km || 
|-id=217 bgcolor=#fefefe
| 360217 ||  || — || September 8, 1999 || Socorro || LINEAR || — || align=right | 1.2 km || 
|-id=218 bgcolor=#fefefe
| 360218 ||  || — || September 8, 1999 || Socorro || LINEAR || — || align=right | 1.2 km || 
|-id=219 bgcolor=#fefefe
| 360219 ||  || — || September 30, 1999 || Kitt Peak || Spacewatch || — || align=right | 1.0 km || 
|-id=220 bgcolor=#fefefe
| 360220 ||  || — || October 7, 1999 || Goodricke-Pigott || R. A. Tucker || — || align=right | 1.1 km || 
|-id=221 bgcolor=#FA8072
| 360221 ||  || — || October 3, 1999 || Socorro || LINEAR || — || align=right data-sort-value="0.90" | 900 m || 
|-id=222 bgcolor=#d6d6d6
| 360222 ||  || — || October 7, 1999 || Kitt Peak || Spacewatch || — || align=right | 4.9 km || 
|-id=223 bgcolor=#d6d6d6
| 360223 ||  || — || October 7, 1999 || Kitt Peak || Spacewatch || — || align=right | 5.0 km || 
|-id=224 bgcolor=#fefefe
| 360224 ||  || — || October 9, 1999 || Kitt Peak || Spacewatch || ERI || align=right | 2.2 km || 
|-id=225 bgcolor=#fefefe
| 360225 ||  || — || October 4, 1999 || Socorro || LINEAR || — || align=right | 1.2 km || 
|-id=226 bgcolor=#fefefe
| 360226 ||  || — || October 9, 1999 || Socorro || LINEAR || NYS || align=right data-sort-value="0.77" | 770 m || 
|-id=227 bgcolor=#fefefe
| 360227 ||  || — || October 9, 1999 || Socorro || LINEAR || — || align=right | 1.1 km || 
|-id=228 bgcolor=#d6d6d6
| 360228 ||  || — || October 12, 1999 || Kitt Peak || Spacewatch || — || align=right | 2.4 km || 
|-id=229 bgcolor=#FA8072
| 360229 ||  || — || November 6, 1999 || Socorro || LINEAR || H || align=right data-sort-value="0.85" | 850 m || 
|-id=230 bgcolor=#fefefe
| 360230 ||  || — || November 4, 1999 || Kitt Peak || Spacewatch || — || align=right | 1.1 km || 
|-id=231 bgcolor=#d6d6d6
| 360231 ||  || — || November 9, 1999 || Kitt Peak || Spacewatch || — || align=right | 4.1 km || 
|-id=232 bgcolor=#d6d6d6
| 360232 ||  || — || November 13, 1999 || Kitt Peak || Spacewatch || HYG || align=right | 2.4 km || 
|-id=233 bgcolor=#d6d6d6
| 360233 ||  || — || November 1, 1999 || Kitt Peak || Spacewatch || LIX || align=right | 3.3 km || 
|-id=234 bgcolor=#E9E9E9
| 360234 ||  || — || January 30, 2000 || Kitt Peak || Spacewatch || — || align=right | 1.3 km || 
|-id=235 bgcolor=#E9E9E9
| 360235 ||  || — || January 27, 2000 || Kitt Peak || Spacewatch || MAR || align=right | 1.1 km || 
|-id=236 bgcolor=#E9E9E9
| 360236 ||  || — || January 27, 2000 || Kitt Peak || Spacewatch || — || align=right | 1.5 km || 
|-id=237 bgcolor=#E9E9E9
| 360237 ||  || — || January 29, 2000 || Kitt Peak || Spacewatch || — || align=right | 1.1 km || 
|-id=238 bgcolor=#E9E9E9
| 360238 ||  || — || February 2, 2000 || Socorro || LINEAR || — || align=right | 1.5 km || 
|-id=239 bgcolor=#E9E9E9
| 360239 ||  || — || February 3, 2000 || Socorro || LINEAR || BRG || align=right | 2.1 km || 
|-id=240 bgcolor=#E9E9E9
| 360240 ||  || — || February 26, 2000 || Kitt Peak || Spacewatch || — || align=right | 1.4 km || 
|-id=241 bgcolor=#E9E9E9
| 360241 ||  || — || March 3, 2000 || Kitt Peak || Spacewatch || — || align=right data-sort-value="0.98" | 980 m || 
|-id=242 bgcolor=#E9E9E9
| 360242 ||  || — || February 25, 2000 || Kitt Peak || Spacewatch || HNS || align=right | 1.3 km || 
|-id=243 bgcolor=#E9E9E9
| 360243 ||  || — || March 3, 2000 || Socorro || LINEAR || — || align=right | 1.7 km || 
|-id=244 bgcolor=#E9E9E9
| 360244 ||  || — || March 29, 2000 || Kitt Peak || Spacewatch || — || align=right | 1.5 km || 
|-id=245 bgcolor=#E9E9E9
| 360245 ||  || — || April 3, 2000 || Socorro || LINEAR || — || align=right | 2.1 km || 
|-id=246 bgcolor=#E9E9E9
| 360246 ||  || — || April 5, 2000 || Socorro || LINEAR || JUN || align=right | 1.3 km || 
|-id=247 bgcolor=#FA8072
| 360247 ||  || — || April 5, 2000 || Socorro || LINEAR || — || align=right data-sort-value="0.80" | 800 m || 
|-id=248 bgcolor=#E9E9E9
| 360248 ||  || — || March 27, 2000 || Kitt Peak || Spacewatch || EUN || align=right | 1.2 km || 
|-id=249 bgcolor=#FA8072
| 360249 ||  || — || April 4, 2000 || Kitt Peak || Spacewatch || — || align=right | 1.5 km || 
|-id=250 bgcolor=#E9E9E9
| 360250 ||  || — || April 10, 2000 || Kitt Peak || M. W. Buie || EUN || align=right | 1.3 km || 
|-id=251 bgcolor=#FA8072
| 360251 ||  || — || April 27, 2000 || Socorro || LINEAR || H || align=right data-sort-value="0.94" | 940 m || 
|-id=252 bgcolor=#E9E9E9
| 360252 ||  || — || April 29, 2000 || Socorro || LINEAR || — || align=right | 2.2 km || 
|-id=253 bgcolor=#E9E9E9
| 360253 ||  || — || April 25, 2000 || Kitt Peak || Spacewatch || — || align=right | 1.4 km || 
|-id=254 bgcolor=#fefefe
| 360254 ||  || — || May 4, 2000 || Socorro || LINEAR || H || align=right | 1.1 km || 
|-id=255 bgcolor=#E9E9E9
| 360255 ||  || — || May 3, 2000 || Socorro || LINEAR || — || align=right | 2.0 km || 
|-id=256 bgcolor=#E9E9E9
| 360256 ||  || — || May 5, 2000 || Kitt Peak || Spacewatch || — || align=right | 1.3 km || 
|-id=257 bgcolor=#E9E9E9
| 360257 ||  || — || May 4, 2000 || Socorro || LINEAR || — || align=right | 2.5 km || 
|-id=258 bgcolor=#E9E9E9
| 360258 ||  || — || May 6, 2000 || Kitt Peak || Spacewatch || EUN || align=right | 1.7 km || 
|-id=259 bgcolor=#E9E9E9
| 360259 ||  || — || May 28, 2000 || Socorro || LINEAR || EUN || align=right | 1.7 km || 
|-id=260 bgcolor=#E9E9E9
| 360260 ||  || — || May 24, 2000 || Kitt Peak || Spacewatch || — || align=right | 2.0 km || 
|-id=261 bgcolor=#E9E9E9
| 360261 ||  || — || July 23, 2000 || Socorro || LINEAR || — || align=right | 3.4 km || 
|-id=262 bgcolor=#E9E9E9
| 360262 ||  || — || July 29, 2000 || Anderson Mesa || LONEOS || — || align=right | 3.1 km || 
|-id=263 bgcolor=#fefefe
| 360263 ||  || — || August 26, 2000 || Socorro || LINEAR || — || align=right data-sort-value="0.89" | 890 m || 
|-id=264 bgcolor=#fefefe
| 360264 ||  || — || August 21, 2000 || Anderson Mesa || LONEOS || FLO || align=right data-sort-value="0.79" | 790 m || 
|-id=265 bgcolor=#fefefe
| 360265 ||  || — || September 24, 2000 || Socorro || LINEAR || — || align=right data-sort-value="0.92" | 920 m || 
|-id=266 bgcolor=#fefefe
| 360266 ||  || — || September 24, 2000 || Socorro || LINEAR || V || align=right data-sort-value="0.93" | 930 m || 
|-id=267 bgcolor=#fefefe
| 360267 ||  || — || September 24, 2000 || Socorro || LINEAR || FLO || align=right | 1.2 km || 
|-id=268 bgcolor=#E9E9E9
| 360268 ||  || — || September 21, 2000 || Kitt Peak || Spacewatch || DOR || align=right | 3.0 km || 
|-id=269 bgcolor=#fefefe
| 360269 ||  || — || September 24, 2000 || Socorro || LINEAR || FLO || align=right data-sort-value="0.80" | 800 m || 
|-id=270 bgcolor=#fefefe
| 360270 ||  || — || September 26, 2000 || Socorro || LINEAR || — || align=right | 1.5 km || 
|-id=271 bgcolor=#fefefe
| 360271 ||  || — || September 27, 2000 || Socorro || LINEAR || FLO || align=right data-sort-value="0.76" | 760 m || 
|-id=272 bgcolor=#fefefe
| 360272 ||  || — || September 24, 2000 || Socorro || LINEAR || — || align=right data-sort-value="0.99" | 990 m || 
|-id=273 bgcolor=#fefefe
| 360273 ||  || — || September 24, 2000 || Socorro || LINEAR || — || align=right data-sort-value="0.81" | 810 m || 
|-id=274 bgcolor=#fefefe
| 360274 ||  || — || September 28, 2000 || Socorro || LINEAR || FLO || align=right data-sort-value="0.87" | 870 m || 
|-id=275 bgcolor=#fefefe
| 360275 ||  || — || September 28, 2000 || Socorro || LINEAR || — || align=right | 1.0 km || 
|-id=276 bgcolor=#fefefe
| 360276 ||  || — || September 28, 2000 || Socorro || LINEAR || — || align=right | 1.0 km || 
|-id=277 bgcolor=#E9E9E9
| 360277 ||  || — || September 20, 2000 || Socorro || LINEAR || — || align=right | 3.3 km || 
|-id=278 bgcolor=#fefefe
| 360278 ||  || — || October 3, 2000 || Socorro || LINEAR || — || align=right | 1.2 km || 
|-id=279 bgcolor=#fefefe
| 360279 ||  || — || October 4, 2000 || Kitt Peak || Spacewatch || — || align=right data-sort-value="0.88" | 880 m || 
|-id=280 bgcolor=#FA8072
| 360280 ||  || — || October 29, 2000 || Socorro || LINEAR || — || align=right | 1.8 km || 
|-id=281 bgcolor=#fefefe
| 360281 ||  || — || October 30, 2000 || Socorro || LINEAR || — || align=right | 1.5 km || 
|-id=282 bgcolor=#fefefe
| 360282 ||  || — || November 1, 2000 || Socorro || LINEAR || — || align=right data-sort-value="0.90" | 900 m || 
|-id=283 bgcolor=#fefefe
| 360283 ||  || — || November 21, 2000 || Socorro || LINEAR || V || align=right data-sort-value="0.93" | 930 m || 
|-id=284 bgcolor=#FA8072
| 360284 ||  || — || November 25, 2000 || Kitt Peak || Spacewatch || H || align=right data-sort-value="0.79" | 790 m || 
|-id=285 bgcolor=#fefefe
| 360285 ||  || — || November 20, 2000 || Socorro || LINEAR || ERI || align=right | 2.5 km || 
|-id=286 bgcolor=#fefefe
| 360286 ||  || — || November 20, 2000 || Socorro || LINEAR || — || align=right | 1.4 km || 
|-id=287 bgcolor=#E9E9E9
| 360287 ||  || — || November 30, 2000 || Anderson Mesa || LONEOS || — || align=right data-sort-value="0.92" | 920 m || 
|-id=288 bgcolor=#d6d6d6
| 360288 ||  || — || January 17, 2001 || Socorro || LINEAR || EUP || align=right | 7.0 km || 
|-id=289 bgcolor=#d6d6d6
| 360289 ||  || — || January 19, 2001 || Kitt Peak || Spacewatch || — || align=right | 4.0 km || 
|-id=290 bgcolor=#d6d6d6
| 360290 ||  || — || February 16, 2001 || Socorro || LINEAR || — || align=right | 4.7 km || 
|-id=291 bgcolor=#fefefe
| 360291 ||  || — || February 17, 2001 || Socorro || LINEAR || — || align=right | 1.7 km || 
|-id=292 bgcolor=#E9E9E9
| 360292 ||  || — || June 14, 2001 || Palomar || NEAT || — || align=right | 1.9 km || 
|-id=293 bgcolor=#E9E9E9
| 360293 ||  || — || July 18, 2001 || Palomar || NEAT || — || align=right | 1.3 km || 
|-id=294 bgcolor=#E9E9E9
| 360294 ||  || — || July 18, 2001 || Palomar || NEAT || — || align=right | 2.1 km || 
|-id=295 bgcolor=#E9E9E9
| 360295 ||  || — || June 29, 2001 || Anderson Mesa || LONEOS || — || align=right | 1.8 km || 
|-id=296 bgcolor=#E9E9E9
| 360296 ||  || — || July 31, 2001 || Palomar || NEAT || MAR || align=right | 1.6 km || 
|-id=297 bgcolor=#E9E9E9
| 360297 ||  || — || August 16, 2001 || Socorro || LINEAR || JUN || align=right | 1.7 km || 
|-id=298 bgcolor=#E9E9E9
| 360298 ||  || — || July 20, 2001 || Anderson Mesa || LONEOS || EUN || align=right | 1.8 km || 
|-id=299 bgcolor=#E9E9E9
| 360299 ||  || — || August 23, 2001 || Anderson Mesa || LONEOS || — || align=right | 2.9 km || 
|-id=300 bgcolor=#E9E9E9
| 360300 ||  || — || August 23, 2001 || Anderson Mesa || LONEOS || — || align=right | 2.1 km || 
|}

360301–360400 

|-bgcolor=#E9E9E9
| 360301 ||  || — || May 29, 2001 || Kitt Peak || Spacewatch || — || align=right | 1.7 km || 
|-id=302 bgcolor=#E9E9E9
| 360302 ||  || — || August 25, 2001 || Socorro || LINEAR || — || align=right | 2.1 km || 
|-id=303 bgcolor=#E9E9E9
| 360303 ||  || — || September 7, 2001 || Socorro || LINEAR || — || align=right | 2.4 km || 
|-id=304 bgcolor=#E9E9E9
| 360304 ||  || — || September 8, 2001 || Socorro || LINEAR || — || align=right | 2.3 km || 
|-id=305 bgcolor=#fefefe
| 360305 ||  || — || September 12, 2001 || Socorro || LINEAR || — || align=right data-sort-value="0.66" | 660 m || 
|-id=306 bgcolor=#E9E9E9
| 360306 ||  || — || September 10, 2001 || Socorro || LINEAR || — || align=right | 2.9 km || 
|-id=307 bgcolor=#E9E9E9
| 360307 ||  || — || September 17, 2001 || Desert Eagle || W. K. Y. Yeung || — || align=right | 2.4 km || 
|-id=308 bgcolor=#E9E9E9
| 360308 ||  || — || September 16, 2001 || Socorro || LINEAR || — || align=right | 1.3 km || 
|-id=309 bgcolor=#E9E9E9
| 360309 ||  || — || September 16, 2001 || Socorro || LINEAR || BAR || align=right | 1.2 km || 
|-id=310 bgcolor=#E9E9E9
| 360310 ||  || — || September 16, 2001 || Socorro || LINEAR || MAR || align=right | 1.2 km || 
|-id=311 bgcolor=#fefefe
| 360311 ||  || — || September 16, 2001 || Socorro || LINEAR || — || align=right | 1.1 km || 
|-id=312 bgcolor=#E9E9E9
| 360312 ||  || — || September 20, 2001 || Socorro || LINEAR || — || align=right | 1.8 km || 
|-id=313 bgcolor=#fefefe
| 360313 ||  || — || September 20, 2001 || Socorro || LINEAR || — || align=right data-sort-value="0.67" | 670 m || 
|-id=314 bgcolor=#E9E9E9
| 360314 ||  || — || September 16, 2001 || Socorro || LINEAR || — || align=right | 1.6 km || 
|-id=315 bgcolor=#E9E9E9
| 360315 ||  || — || September 16, 2001 || Socorro || LINEAR || — || align=right | 1.5 km || 
|-id=316 bgcolor=#fefefe
| 360316 ||  || — || September 17, 2001 || Socorro || LINEAR || — || align=right data-sort-value="0.81" | 810 m || 
|-id=317 bgcolor=#d6d6d6
| 360317 ||  || — || September 16, 2001 || Socorro || LINEAR || — || align=right | 3.3 km || 
|-id=318 bgcolor=#E9E9E9
| 360318 ||  || — || September 19, 2001 || Socorro || LINEAR || — || align=right | 1.9 km || 
|-id=319 bgcolor=#E9E9E9
| 360319 ||  || — || September 19, 2001 || Socorro || LINEAR || — || align=right | 1.9 km || 
|-id=320 bgcolor=#fefefe
| 360320 ||  || — || September 19, 2001 || Socorro || LINEAR || — || align=right data-sort-value="0.70" | 700 m || 
|-id=321 bgcolor=#E9E9E9
| 360321 ||  || — || September 22, 2001 || Kitt Peak || Spacewatch || — || align=right | 1.9 km || 
|-id=322 bgcolor=#E9E9E9
| 360322 ||  || — || September 25, 2001 || Socorro || LINEAR || EUN || align=right | 1.4 km || 
|-id=323 bgcolor=#E9E9E9
| 360323 ||  || — || October 10, 2001 || Palomar || NEAT || — || align=right | 1.6 km || 
|-id=324 bgcolor=#fefefe
| 360324 ||  || — || October 13, 2001 || Socorro || LINEAR || H || align=right data-sort-value="0.93" | 930 m || 
|-id=325 bgcolor=#fefefe
| 360325 ||  || — || October 13, 2001 || Socorro || LINEAR || FLO || align=right data-sort-value="0.50" | 500 m || 
|-id=326 bgcolor=#fefefe
| 360326 ||  || — || September 20, 2001 || Socorro || LINEAR || — || align=right data-sort-value="0.98" | 980 m || 
|-id=327 bgcolor=#d6d6d6
| 360327 ||  || — || October 14, 2001 || Socorro || LINEAR || — || align=right | 3.4 km || 
|-id=328 bgcolor=#E9E9E9
| 360328 ||  || — || October 12, 2001 || Haleakala || NEAT || JUN || align=right | 1.7 km || 
|-id=329 bgcolor=#E9E9E9
| 360329 ||  || — || October 14, 2001 || Socorro || LINEAR || — || align=right | 1.8 km || 
|-id=330 bgcolor=#E9E9E9
| 360330 ||  || — || October 14, 2001 || Socorro || LINEAR || — || align=right | 2.8 km || 
|-id=331 bgcolor=#E9E9E9
| 360331 ||  || — || October 14, 2001 || Socorro || LINEAR || JUN || align=right | 1.5 km || 
|-id=332 bgcolor=#fefefe
| 360332 ||  || — || October 15, 2001 || Socorro || LINEAR || — || align=right | 1.0 km || 
|-id=333 bgcolor=#fefefe
| 360333 ||  || — || October 14, 2001 || Haleakala || NEAT || H || align=right data-sort-value="0.95" | 950 m || 
|-id=334 bgcolor=#E9E9E9
| 360334 ||  || — || October 14, 2001 || Socorro || LINEAR || — || align=right | 1.9 km || 
|-id=335 bgcolor=#fefefe
| 360335 ||  || — || October 14, 2001 || Apache Point || SDSS || — || align=right data-sort-value="0.82" | 820 m || 
|-id=336 bgcolor=#fefefe
| 360336 ||  || — || August 21, 2004 || Siding Spring || SSS || — || align=right data-sort-value="0.65" | 650 m || 
|-id=337 bgcolor=#FA8072
| 360337 ||  || — || October 17, 2001 || Socorro || LINEAR || — || align=right | 3.3 km || 
|-id=338 bgcolor=#E9E9E9
| 360338 ||  || — || October 23, 2001 || Socorro || LINEAR || — || align=right | 3.2 km || 
|-id=339 bgcolor=#fefefe
| 360339 ||  || — || October 24, 2001 || Desert Eagle || W. K. Y. Yeung || — || align=right data-sort-value="0.99" | 990 m || 
|-id=340 bgcolor=#E9E9E9
| 360340 ||  || — || October 25, 2001 || Desert Eagle || W. K. Y. Yeung || — || align=right | 3.0 km || 
|-id=341 bgcolor=#E9E9E9
| 360341 ||  || — || October 16, 2001 || Socorro || LINEAR || EUN || align=right | 1.6 km || 
|-id=342 bgcolor=#fefefe
| 360342 ||  || — || October 17, 2001 || Socorro || LINEAR || — || align=right data-sort-value="0.69" | 690 m || 
|-id=343 bgcolor=#fefefe
| 360343 ||  || — || October 20, 2001 || Socorro || LINEAR || — || align=right | 1.1 km || 
|-id=344 bgcolor=#fefefe
| 360344 ||  || — || October 20, 2001 || Socorro || LINEAR || — || align=right data-sort-value="0.72" | 720 m || 
|-id=345 bgcolor=#E9E9E9
| 360345 ||  || — || October 22, 2001 || Socorro || LINEAR || — || align=right | 2.4 km || 
|-id=346 bgcolor=#E9E9E9
| 360346 ||  || — || October 23, 2001 || Socorro || LINEAR || — || align=right | 2.4 km || 
|-id=347 bgcolor=#E9E9E9
| 360347 ||  || — || October 23, 2001 || Socorro || LINEAR || — || align=right | 2.5 km || 
|-id=348 bgcolor=#E9E9E9
| 360348 ||  || — || September 18, 2001 || Anderson Mesa || LONEOS || — || align=right | 3.3 km || 
|-id=349 bgcolor=#E9E9E9
| 360349 ||  || — || November 11, 2001 || Apache Point || SDSS || — || align=right | 1.9 km || 
|-id=350 bgcolor=#E9E9E9
| 360350 ||  || — || November 11, 2001 || Apache Point || SDSS || — || align=right | 2.5 km || 
|-id=351 bgcolor=#d6d6d6
| 360351 ||  || — || November 16, 2001 || Kitt Peak || Spacewatch || BRA || align=right | 1.3 km || 
|-id=352 bgcolor=#E9E9E9
| 360352 ||  || — || November 19, 2001 || Socorro || LINEAR || — || align=right | 3.0 km || 
|-id=353 bgcolor=#E9E9E9
| 360353 ||  || — || December 14, 2001 || Socorro || LINEAR || GEF || align=right | 1.4 km || 
|-id=354 bgcolor=#d6d6d6
| 360354 ||  || — || December 15, 2001 || Socorro || LINEAR || — || align=right | 3.2 km || 
|-id=355 bgcolor=#fefefe
| 360355 ||  || — || December 15, 2001 || Socorro || LINEAR || — || align=right data-sort-value="0.62" | 620 m || 
|-id=356 bgcolor=#fefefe
| 360356 ||  || — || November 20, 2001 || Socorro || LINEAR || FLO || align=right data-sort-value="0.66" | 660 m || 
|-id=357 bgcolor=#E9E9E9
| 360357 ||  || — || December 15, 2001 || Socorro || LINEAR || — || align=right | 3.2 km || 
|-id=358 bgcolor=#fefefe
| 360358 ||  || — || December 18, 2001 || Socorro || LINEAR || NYS || align=right data-sort-value="0.51" | 510 m || 
|-id=359 bgcolor=#fefefe
| 360359 ||  || — || December 17, 2001 || Palomar || NEAT || ERI || align=right | 1.6 km || 
|-id=360 bgcolor=#E9E9E9
| 360360 ||  || — || December 19, 2001 || Kitt Peak || Spacewatch || — || align=right | 2.9 km || 
|-id=361 bgcolor=#FA8072
| 360361 ||  || — || January 8, 2002 || Haleakala || NEAT || — || align=right | 1.2 km || 
|-id=362 bgcolor=#fefefe
| 360362 ||  || — || January 13, 2002 || Kitt Peak || Spacewatch || H || align=right data-sort-value="0.91" | 910 m || 
|-id=363 bgcolor=#fefefe
| 360363 ||  || — || January 9, 2002 || Socorro || LINEAR || H || align=right data-sort-value="0.85" | 850 m || 
|-id=364 bgcolor=#fefefe
| 360364 ||  || — || January 13, 2002 || Kitt Peak || Spacewatch || — || align=right data-sort-value="0.81" | 810 m || 
|-id=365 bgcolor=#fefefe
| 360365 ||  || — || January 8, 2002 || Socorro || LINEAR || — || align=right | 1.0 km || 
|-id=366 bgcolor=#fefefe
| 360366 ||  || — || January 9, 2002 || Socorro || LINEAR || — || align=right data-sort-value="0.71" | 710 m || 
|-id=367 bgcolor=#fefefe
| 360367 ||  || — || January 9, 2002 || Socorro || LINEAR || ERI || align=right | 1.6 km || 
|-id=368 bgcolor=#fefefe
| 360368 ||  || — || January 13, 2002 || Socorro || LINEAR || H || align=right data-sort-value="0.91" | 910 m || 
|-id=369 bgcolor=#fefefe
| 360369 ||  || — || January 9, 2002 || Socorro || LINEAR || — || align=right | 2.2 km || 
|-id=370 bgcolor=#d6d6d6
| 360370 ||  || — || January 13, 2002 || Socorro || LINEAR || — || align=right | 4.1 km || 
|-id=371 bgcolor=#fefefe
| 360371 ||  || — || January 9, 2002 || Socorro || LINEAR || FLO || align=right data-sort-value="0.70" | 700 m || 
|-id=372 bgcolor=#fefefe
| 360372 ||  || — || January 12, 2002 || Socorro || LINEAR || H || align=right data-sort-value="0.89" | 890 m || 
|-id=373 bgcolor=#d6d6d6
| 360373 ||  || — || January 13, 2002 || Socorro || LINEAR || — || align=right | 2.2 km || 
|-id=374 bgcolor=#fefefe
| 360374 ||  || — || January 13, 2002 || Socorro || LINEAR || — || align=right data-sort-value="0.78" | 780 m || 
|-id=375 bgcolor=#fefefe
| 360375 ||  || — || February 6, 2002 || Palomar || NEAT || — || align=right | 1.3 km || 
|-id=376 bgcolor=#fefefe
| 360376 ||  || — || February 12, 2002 || Desert Eagle || W. K. Y. Yeung || MAS || align=right data-sort-value="0.74" | 740 m || 
|-id=377 bgcolor=#fefefe
| 360377 ||  || — || February 7, 2002 || Socorro || LINEAR || FLO || align=right data-sort-value="0.83" | 830 m || 
|-id=378 bgcolor=#d6d6d6
| 360378 ||  || — || February 13, 2002 || Socorro || LINEAR || — || align=right | 4.3 km || 
|-id=379 bgcolor=#fefefe
| 360379 ||  || — || February 7, 2002 || Socorro || LINEAR || V || align=right data-sort-value="0.85" | 850 m || 
|-id=380 bgcolor=#d6d6d6
| 360380 ||  || — || February 10, 2002 || Socorro || LINEAR || — || align=right | 2.6 km || 
|-id=381 bgcolor=#fefefe
| 360381 ||  || — || February 10, 2002 || Socorro || LINEAR || — || align=right data-sort-value="0.77" | 770 m || 
|-id=382 bgcolor=#d6d6d6
| 360382 ||  || — || February 9, 2002 || Kitt Peak || Spacewatch || — || align=right | 2.7 km || 
|-id=383 bgcolor=#fefefe
| 360383 ||  || — || February 7, 2002 || Palomar || NEAT || — || align=right data-sort-value="0.99" | 990 m || 
|-id=384 bgcolor=#fefefe
| 360384 ||  || — || February 7, 2002 || Palomar || NEAT || — || align=right data-sort-value="0.69" | 690 m || 
|-id=385 bgcolor=#d6d6d6
| 360385 ||  || — || February 7, 2002 || Haleakala || NEAT || — || align=right | 2.6 km || 
|-id=386 bgcolor=#d6d6d6
| 360386 ||  || — || February 14, 2002 || Kitt Peak || Spacewatch || EOS || align=right | 2.1 km || 
|-id=387 bgcolor=#fefefe
| 360387 ||  || — || February 6, 2002 || Palomar || NEAT || — || align=right data-sort-value="0.97" | 970 m || 
|-id=388 bgcolor=#fefefe
| 360388 ||  || — || February 12, 2002 || Socorro || LINEAR || FLO || align=right data-sort-value="0.84" | 840 m || 
|-id=389 bgcolor=#fefefe
| 360389 ||  || — || February 11, 2002 || Kitt Peak || Spacewatch || EUT || align=right data-sort-value="0.50" | 500 m || 
|-id=390 bgcolor=#C2FFFF
| 360390 ||  || — || July 26, 2008 || Siding Spring || SSS || L4 || align=right | 14 km || 
|-id=391 bgcolor=#fefefe
| 360391 ||  || — || February 19, 2002 || Socorro || LINEAR || PHO || align=right | 1.1 km || 
|-id=392 bgcolor=#fefefe
| 360392 ||  || — || March 10, 2002 || Haleakala || NEAT || H || align=right data-sort-value="0.83" | 830 m || 
|-id=393 bgcolor=#fefefe
| 360393 ||  || — || March 10, 2002 || Cima Ekar || ADAS || — || align=right | 1.4 km || 
|-id=394 bgcolor=#d6d6d6
| 360394 ||  || — || March 10, 2002 || Kitt Peak || Spacewatch || — || align=right | 3.1 km || 
|-id=395 bgcolor=#fefefe
| 360395 ||  || — || March 9, 2002 || Kitt Peak || Spacewatch || NYS || align=right data-sort-value="0.49" | 490 m || 
|-id=396 bgcolor=#d6d6d6
| 360396 ||  || — || March 12, 2002 || Palomar || NEAT || — || align=right | 2.2 km || 
|-id=397 bgcolor=#fefefe
| 360397 ||  || — || March 5, 2002 || Anderson Mesa || LONEOS || — || align=right data-sort-value="0.85" | 850 m || 
|-id=398 bgcolor=#d6d6d6
| 360398 ||  || — || March 10, 2002 || Cima Ekar || ADAS || URS || align=right | 3.3 km || 
|-id=399 bgcolor=#fefefe
| 360399 ||  || — || March 10, 2002 || Cima Ekar || ADAS || NYS || align=right data-sort-value="0.49" | 490 m || 
|-id=400 bgcolor=#d6d6d6
| 360400 ||  || — || February 13, 2002 || Kitt Peak || Spacewatch || THM || align=right | 2.1 km || 
|}

360401–360500 

|-bgcolor=#fefefe
| 360401 ||  || — || March 16, 2002 || Eskridge || G. Hug || ERI || align=right | 1.8 km || 
|-id=402 bgcolor=#d6d6d6
| 360402 ||  || — || March 19, 2002 || Anderson Mesa || LONEOS || — || align=right | 3.7 km || 
|-id=403 bgcolor=#fefefe
| 360403 ||  || — || March 23, 2002 || Palomar || M. White, M. Collins || — || align=right data-sort-value="0.89" | 890 m || 
|-id=404 bgcolor=#d6d6d6
| 360404 ||  || — || April 13, 2002 || Palomar || NEAT || — || align=right | 3.6 km || 
|-id=405 bgcolor=#fefefe
| 360405 ||  || — || April 6, 2002 || Cerro Tololo || M. W. Buie || MAS || align=right data-sort-value="0.56" | 560 m || 
|-id=406 bgcolor=#fefefe
| 360406 ||  || — || April 1, 2002 || Palomar || NEAT || — || align=right data-sort-value="0.91" | 910 m || 
|-id=407 bgcolor=#fefefe
| 360407 ||  || — || April 4, 2002 || Palomar || NEAT || NYS || align=right data-sort-value="0.85" | 850 m || 
|-id=408 bgcolor=#fefefe
| 360408 ||  || — || April 8, 2002 || Palomar || NEAT || — || align=right | 1.0 km || 
|-id=409 bgcolor=#fefefe
| 360409 ||  || — || April 9, 2002 || Anderson Mesa || LONEOS || — || align=right | 1.1 km || 
|-id=410 bgcolor=#d6d6d6
| 360410 ||  || — || April 10, 2002 || Socorro || LINEAR || — || align=right | 3.3 km || 
|-id=411 bgcolor=#d6d6d6
| 360411 ||  || — || April 10, 2002 || Socorro || LINEAR || — || align=right | 3.8 km || 
|-id=412 bgcolor=#fefefe
| 360412 ||  || — || April 10, 2002 || Socorro || LINEAR || — || align=right | 1.2 km || 
|-id=413 bgcolor=#fefefe
| 360413 ||  || — || April 10, 2002 || Socorro || LINEAR || — || align=right | 1.0 km || 
|-id=414 bgcolor=#fefefe
| 360414 ||  || — || April 10, 2002 || Socorro || LINEAR || — || align=right | 1.2 km || 
|-id=415 bgcolor=#d6d6d6
| 360415 ||  || — || April 11, 2002 || Anderson Mesa || LONEOS || — || align=right | 5.7 km || 
|-id=416 bgcolor=#fefefe
| 360416 ||  || — || April 11, 2002 || Socorro || LINEAR || PHO || align=right | 1.4 km || 
|-id=417 bgcolor=#fefefe
| 360417 ||  || — || April 11, 2002 || Socorro || LINEAR || — || align=right | 1.2 km || 
|-id=418 bgcolor=#fefefe
| 360418 ||  || — || April 12, 2002 || Socorro || LINEAR || H || align=right data-sort-value="0.81" | 810 m || 
|-id=419 bgcolor=#d6d6d6
| 360419 ||  || — || April 4, 2002 || Palomar || NEAT || — || align=right | 3.9 km || 
|-id=420 bgcolor=#fefefe
| 360420 ||  || — || April 13, 2002 || Palomar || NEAT || — || align=right data-sort-value="0.96" | 960 m || 
|-id=421 bgcolor=#d6d6d6
| 360421 ||  || — || April 13, 2002 || Palomar || NEAT || — || align=right | 4.3 km || 
|-id=422 bgcolor=#d6d6d6
| 360422 ||  || — || April 10, 2002 || Socorro || LINEAR || TIR || align=right | 4.3 km || 
|-id=423 bgcolor=#d6d6d6
| 360423 ||  || — || April 10, 2002 || Palomar || NEAT || — || align=right | 3.2 km || 
|-id=424 bgcolor=#fefefe
| 360424 ||  || — || April 11, 2002 || Palomar || NEAT || — || align=right data-sort-value="0.96" | 960 m || 
|-id=425 bgcolor=#fefefe
| 360425 ||  || — || April 13, 2002 || Palomar || NEAT || — || align=right | 1.1 km || 
|-id=426 bgcolor=#d6d6d6
| 360426 ||  || — || April 8, 2002 || Palomar || NEAT || — || align=right | 3.0 km || 
|-id=427 bgcolor=#fefefe
| 360427 ||  || — || April 9, 2002 || Palomar || NEAT || — || align=right data-sort-value="0.91" | 910 m || 
|-id=428 bgcolor=#fefefe
| 360428 ||  || — || April 22, 2002 || Socorro || LINEAR || H || align=right | 1.1 km || 
|-id=429 bgcolor=#fefefe
| 360429 ||  || — || April 30, 2002 || Palomar || NEAT || — || align=right | 1.1 km || 
|-id=430 bgcolor=#d6d6d6
| 360430 ||  || — || April 22, 2002 || Palomar || NEAT || — || align=right | 3.7 km || 
|-id=431 bgcolor=#d6d6d6
| 360431 ||  || — || May 1, 2002 || Palomar || NEAT || Tj (2.96) || align=right | 4.0 km || 
|-id=432 bgcolor=#fefefe
| 360432 ||  || — || May 7, 2002 || Kitt Peak || Spacewatch || — || align=right data-sort-value="0.83" | 830 m || 
|-id=433 bgcolor=#FFC2E0
| 360433 ||  || — || May 7, 2002 || Socorro || LINEAR || APO +1km || align=right | 1.1 km || 
|-id=434 bgcolor=#fefefe
| 360434 ||  || — || May 9, 2002 || Socorro || LINEAR || — || align=right | 1.1 km || 
|-id=435 bgcolor=#fefefe
| 360435 ||  || — || May 9, 2002 || Socorro || LINEAR || H || align=right | 1.1 km || 
|-id=436 bgcolor=#FA8072
| 360436 ||  || — || May 7, 2002 || Socorro || LINEAR || — || align=right data-sort-value="0.89" | 890 m || 
|-id=437 bgcolor=#d6d6d6
| 360437 ||  || — || May 8, 2002 || Socorro || LINEAR || EOS || align=right | 3.4 km || 
|-id=438 bgcolor=#fefefe
| 360438 ||  || — || May 11, 2002 || Socorro || LINEAR || H || align=right data-sort-value="0.90" | 900 m || 
|-id=439 bgcolor=#fefefe
| 360439 ||  || — || May 5, 2002 || Palomar || NEAT || LCI || align=right | 1.5 km || 
|-id=440 bgcolor=#d6d6d6
| 360440 ||  || — || April 10, 2002 || Socorro || LINEAR || THB || align=right | 4.1 km || 
|-id=441 bgcolor=#d6d6d6
| 360441 ||  || — || May 14, 2002 || Palomar || NEAT || — || align=right | 4.1 km || 
|-id=442 bgcolor=#d6d6d6
| 360442 ||  || — || May 30, 2002 || Palomar || NEAT || — || align=right | 5.1 km || 
|-id=443 bgcolor=#fefefe
| 360443 ||  || — || June 9, 2002 || Haleakala || NEAT || V || align=right data-sort-value="0.84" | 840 m || 
|-id=444 bgcolor=#fefefe
| 360444 ||  || — || May 26, 2010 || WISE || WISE || NYS || align=right | 2.0 km || 
|-id=445 bgcolor=#d6d6d6
| 360445 ||  || — || March 12, 2007 || Catalina || CSS || — || align=right | 3.3 km || 
|-id=446 bgcolor=#fefefe
| 360446 ||  || — || July 4, 2002 || Palomar || NEAT || — || align=right | 1.1 km || 
|-id=447 bgcolor=#fefefe
| 360447 ||  || — || July 14, 2002 || Palomar || NEAT || MAS || align=right data-sort-value="0.85" | 850 m || 
|-id=448 bgcolor=#E9E9E9
| 360448 ||  || — || January 8, 2000 || Socorro || LINEAR || — || align=right | 2.1 km || 
|-id=449 bgcolor=#fefefe
| 360449 ||  || — || July 29, 2002 || Palomar || S. F. Hönig || V || align=right data-sort-value="0.69" | 690 m || 
|-id=450 bgcolor=#fefefe
| 360450 ||  || — || August 8, 2002 || Palomar || NEAT || — || align=right | 1.0 km || 
|-id=451 bgcolor=#E9E9E9
| 360451 ||  || — || August 8, 2002 || Palomar || NEAT || — || align=right data-sort-value="0.90" | 900 m || 
|-id=452 bgcolor=#E9E9E9
| 360452 ||  || — || August 4, 2002 || Palomar || NEAT || JUN || align=right | 1.3 km || 
|-id=453 bgcolor=#E9E9E9
| 360453 ||  || — || August 29, 2002 || Palomar || R. Matson || — || align=right data-sort-value="0.86" | 860 m || 
|-id=454 bgcolor=#E9E9E9
| 360454 ||  || — || August 29, 2002 || Palomar || S. F. Hönig || EUN || align=right | 1.1 km || 
|-id=455 bgcolor=#E9E9E9
| 360455 ||  || — || August 30, 2002 || Palomar || NEAT || — || align=right | 2.0 km || 
|-id=456 bgcolor=#E9E9E9
| 360456 ||  || — || August 16, 2002 || Palomar || NEAT || — || align=right | 1.0 km || 
|-id=457 bgcolor=#E9E9E9
| 360457 ||  || — || March 13, 1996 || Kitt Peak || Spacewatch || — || align=right | 1.2 km || 
|-id=458 bgcolor=#E9E9E9
| 360458 ||  || — || July 19, 2010 || Siding Spring || SSS || — || align=right | 1.3 km || 
|-id=459 bgcolor=#d6d6d6
| 360459 ||  || — || October 16, 2003 || Kitt Peak || Spacewatch || 7:4 || align=right | 4.2 km || 
|-id=460 bgcolor=#E9E9E9
| 360460 ||  || — || May 26, 2006 || Mount Lemmon || Mount Lemmon Survey || — || align=right | 1.6 km || 
|-id=461 bgcolor=#E9E9E9
| 360461 || 2002 RL || — || September 2, 2002 || Ondřejov || P. Pravec, P. Kušnirák || — || align=right | 1.3 km || 
|-id=462 bgcolor=#E9E9E9
| 360462 ||  || — || September 10, 2002 || Palomar || NEAT || — || align=right | 1.4 km || 
|-id=463 bgcolor=#E9E9E9
| 360463 ||  || — || September 13, 2002 || Palomar || NEAT || — || align=right | 1.0 km || 
|-id=464 bgcolor=#E9E9E9
| 360464 ||  || — || September 14, 2002 || Palomar || R. Matson || — || align=right | 1.7 km || 
|-id=465 bgcolor=#E9E9E9
| 360465 ||  || — || September 14, 2002 || Palomar || NEAT || EUN || align=right | 1.4 km || 
|-id=466 bgcolor=#E9E9E9
| 360466 ||  || — || September 15, 2002 || Palomar || NEAT || — || align=right | 1.6 km || 
|-id=467 bgcolor=#E9E9E9
| 360467 ||  || — || September 11, 2002 || Haleakala || NEAT || — || align=right data-sort-value="0.87" | 870 m || 
|-id=468 bgcolor=#E9E9E9
| 360468 ||  || — || September 28, 2002 || Palomar || NEAT || — || align=right | 1.8 km || 
|-id=469 bgcolor=#E9E9E9
| 360469 ||  || — || September 30, 2002 || Haleakala || NEAT || — || align=right | 1.4 km || 
|-id=470 bgcolor=#E9E9E9
| 360470 ||  || — || October 2, 2002 || Socorro || LINEAR || — || align=right | 1.2 km || 
|-id=471 bgcolor=#E9E9E9
| 360471 ||  || — || October 2, 2002 || Socorro || LINEAR || — || align=right | 1.7 km || 
|-id=472 bgcolor=#E9E9E9
| 360472 ||  || — || October 2, 2002 || Socorro || LINEAR || — || align=right | 2.3 km || 
|-id=473 bgcolor=#E9E9E9
| 360473 ||  || — || October 2, 2002 || Socorro || LINEAR || — || align=right | 2.1 km || 
|-id=474 bgcolor=#E9E9E9
| 360474 ||  || — || October 4, 2002 || Anderson Mesa || LONEOS || — || align=right | 1.5 km || 
|-id=475 bgcolor=#E9E9E9
| 360475 ||  || — || October 7, 2002 || Socorro || LINEAR || ADE || align=right | 2.5 km || 
|-id=476 bgcolor=#E9E9E9
| 360476 ||  || — || October 8, 2002 || Anderson Mesa || LONEOS || — || align=right | 1.1 km || 
|-id=477 bgcolor=#E9E9E9
| 360477 ||  || — || October 7, 2002 || Haleakala || NEAT || MAR || align=right | 1.5 km || 
|-id=478 bgcolor=#E9E9E9
| 360478 ||  || — || October 9, 2002 || Kitt Peak || Spacewatch || — || align=right | 1.2 km || 
|-id=479 bgcolor=#E9E9E9
| 360479 ||  || — || October 9, 2002 || Socorro || LINEAR || RAF || align=right | 1.1 km || 
|-id=480 bgcolor=#E9E9E9
| 360480 ||  || — || October 11, 2002 || Socorro || LINEAR || — || align=right | 1.5 km || 
|-id=481 bgcolor=#E9E9E9
| 360481 ||  || — || October 10, 2002 || Apache Point || SDSS || ADE || align=right | 2.4 km || 
|-id=482 bgcolor=#E9E9E9
| 360482 ||  || — || October 10, 2002 || Palomar || NEAT || — || align=right | 1.8 km || 
|-id=483 bgcolor=#E9E9E9
| 360483 ||  || — || October 31, 2002 || Anderson Mesa || LONEOS || — || align=right | 1.8 km || 
|-id=484 bgcolor=#fefefe
| 360484 ||  || — || October 29, 2002 || Apache Point || SDSS || — || align=right | 1.3 km || 
|-id=485 bgcolor=#E9E9E9
| 360485 ||  || — || October 30, 2002 || Apache Point || SDSS || KON || align=right | 3.1 km || 
|-id=486 bgcolor=#E9E9E9
| 360486 ||  || — || October 16, 2002 || Palomar || NEAT || — || align=right | 1.4 km || 
|-id=487 bgcolor=#E9E9E9
| 360487 ||  || — || November 2, 2002 || La Palma || La Palma Obs. || — || align=right | 1.3 km || 
|-id=488 bgcolor=#E9E9E9
| 360488 ||  || — || November 6, 2002 || Socorro || LINEAR || — || align=right | 2.2 km || 
|-id=489 bgcolor=#E9E9E9
| 360489 ||  || — || November 7, 2002 || Socorro || LINEAR || EUN || align=right | 1.5 km || 
|-id=490 bgcolor=#E9E9E9
| 360490 ||  || — || November 7, 2002 || Socorro || LINEAR || — || align=right | 1.8 km || 
|-id=491 bgcolor=#FA8072
| 360491 ||  || — || November 13, 2002 || Palomar || NEAT || — || align=right | 1.8 km || 
|-id=492 bgcolor=#E9E9E9
| 360492 ||  || — || November 11, 2002 || Kvistaberg || UDAS || — || align=right | 2.5 km || 
|-id=493 bgcolor=#E9E9E9
| 360493 ||  || — || November 12, 2002 || Socorro || LINEAR || — || align=right | 2.9 km || 
|-id=494 bgcolor=#E9E9E9
| 360494 ||  || — || November 12, 2002 || Socorro || LINEAR || — || align=right | 2.7 km || 
|-id=495 bgcolor=#E9E9E9
| 360495 ||  || — || November 5, 2002 || Palomar || NEAT || EUN || align=right | 1.5 km || 
|-id=496 bgcolor=#E9E9E9
| 360496 ||  || — || December 1, 2002 || Haleakala || NEAT || HNS || align=right | 1.7 km || 
|-id=497 bgcolor=#E9E9E9
| 360497 ||  || — || December 3, 2002 || Palomar || NEAT || — || align=right | 1.7 km || 
|-id=498 bgcolor=#E9E9E9
| 360498 ||  || — || December 2, 2002 || Socorro || LINEAR || — || align=right | 3.3 km || 
|-id=499 bgcolor=#E9E9E9
| 360499 ||  || — || December 10, 2002 || Palomar || NEAT || — || align=right | 3.0 km || 
|-id=500 bgcolor=#d6d6d6
| 360500 ||  || — || January 1, 2003 || Socorro || LINEAR || — || align=right | 3.7 km || 
|}

360501–360600 

|-bgcolor=#E9E9E9
| 360501 ||  || — || January 26, 2003 || Haleakala || NEAT || — || align=right | 3.0 km || 
|-id=502 bgcolor=#FFC2E0
| 360502 ||  || — || March 9, 2003 || Anderson Mesa || LONEOS || ATE || align=right data-sort-value="0.28" | 280 m || 
|-id=503 bgcolor=#fefefe
| 360503 ||  || — || April 9, 2003 || Kitt Peak || Spacewatch || V || align=right data-sort-value="0.81" | 810 m || 
|-id=504 bgcolor=#fefefe
| 360504 ||  || — || April 26, 2003 || Kitt Peak || Spacewatch || — || align=right data-sort-value="0.91" | 910 m || 
|-id=505 bgcolor=#fefefe
| 360505 ||  || — || April 25, 2003 || Campo Imperatore || CINEOS || FLO || align=right data-sort-value="0.75" | 750 m || 
|-id=506 bgcolor=#d6d6d6
| 360506 ||  || — || May 8, 2003 || Haleakala || NEAT || — || align=right | 4.2 km || 
|-id=507 bgcolor=#d6d6d6
| 360507 || 2003 MK || — || June 20, 2003 || Nashville || R. Clingan || — || align=right | 2.5 km || 
|-id=508 bgcolor=#d6d6d6
| 360508 ||  || — || July 4, 2003 || Kitt Peak || Spacewatch || — || align=right | 3.3 km || 
|-id=509 bgcolor=#FA8072
| 360509 ||  || — || July 23, 2003 || Wise || D. Polishook || — || align=right | 1.1 km || 
|-id=510 bgcolor=#fefefe
| 360510 ||  || — || July 22, 2003 || Haleakala || NEAT || — || align=right | 1.1 km || 
|-id=511 bgcolor=#fefefe
| 360511 ||  || — || July 24, 2003 || Campo Imperatore || CINEOS || — || align=right data-sort-value="0.94" | 940 m || 
|-id=512 bgcolor=#d6d6d6
| 360512 ||  || — || July 22, 2003 || Palomar || NEAT || — || align=right | 2.5 km || 
|-id=513 bgcolor=#fefefe
| 360513 ||  || — || August 19, 2003 || Campo Imperatore || CINEOS || NYS || align=right data-sort-value="0.59" | 590 m || 
|-id=514 bgcolor=#fefefe
| 360514 ||  || — || August 21, 2003 || Socorro || LINEAR || — || align=right | 3.0 km || 
|-id=515 bgcolor=#fefefe
| 360515 ||  || — || August 20, 2003 || Campo Imperatore || CINEOS || — || align=right data-sort-value="0.75" | 750 m || 
|-id=516 bgcolor=#fefefe
| 360516 ||  || — || August 21, 2003 || Haleakala || NEAT || NYS || align=right data-sort-value="0.92" | 920 m || 
|-id=517 bgcolor=#fefefe
| 360517 ||  || — || August 22, 2003 || Palomar || NEAT || NYS || align=right data-sort-value="0.69" | 690 m || 
|-id=518 bgcolor=#fefefe
| 360518 ||  || — || August 22, 2003 || Palomar || NEAT || — || align=right | 1.1 km || 
|-id=519 bgcolor=#d6d6d6
| 360519 ||  || — || August 22, 2003 || Palomar || NEAT || HYG || align=right | 3.8 km || 
|-id=520 bgcolor=#fefefe
| 360520 ||  || — || August 23, 2003 || Socorro || LINEAR || FLO || align=right data-sort-value="0.76" | 760 m || 
|-id=521 bgcolor=#FA8072
| 360521 ||  || — || August 23, 2003 || Socorro || LINEAR || — || align=right | 1.1 km || 
|-id=522 bgcolor=#fefefe
| 360522 ||  || — || August 25, 2003 || Palomar || NEAT || PHO || align=right | 1.1 km || 
|-id=523 bgcolor=#d6d6d6
| 360523 ||  || — || August 28, 2003 || Palomar || NEAT || — || align=right | 2.8 km || 
|-id=524 bgcolor=#d6d6d6
| 360524 ||  || — || August 24, 2003 || Palomar || NEAT || — || align=right | 3.6 km || 
|-id=525 bgcolor=#fefefe
| 360525 ||  || — || August 29, 2003 || Socorro || LINEAR || V || align=right data-sort-value="0.84" | 840 m || 
|-id=526 bgcolor=#d6d6d6
| 360526 ||  || — || August 19, 2003 || Wise || Wise Obs. || TIR || align=right | 3.4 km || 
|-id=527 bgcolor=#fefefe
| 360527 ||  || — || September 15, 2003 || Haleakala || NEAT || — || align=right | 1.3 km || 
|-id=528 bgcolor=#fefefe
| 360528 ||  || — || September 15, 2003 || Anderson Mesa || LONEOS || FLO || align=right data-sort-value="0.91" | 910 m || 
|-id=529 bgcolor=#fefefe
| 360529 ||  || — || September 18, 2003 || Kitt Peak || Spacewatch || NYS || align=right data-sort-value="0.83" | 830 m || 
|-id=530 bgcolor=#fefefe
| 360530 ||  || — || September 16, 2003 || Anderson Mesa || LONEOS || H || align=right data-sort-value="0.73" | 730 m || 
|-id=531 bgcolor=#d6d6d6
| 360531 ||  || — || September 19, 2003 || Kitt Peak || Spacewatch || Tj (2.93) || align=right | 5.4 km || 
|-id=532 bgcolor=#fefefe
| 360532 ||  || — || September 18, 2003 || Socorro || LINEAR || NYS || align=right data-sort-value="0.69" | 690 m || 
|-id=533 bgcolor=#fefefe
| 360533 ||  || — || September 19, 2003 || Kitt Peak || Spacewatch || V || align=right data-sort-value="0.80" | 800 m || 
|-id=534 bgcolor=#fefefe
| 360534 ||  || — || September 21, 2003 || Kitt Peak || Spacewatch || NYS || align=right data-sort-value="0.61" | 610 m || 
|-id=535 bgcolor=#fefefe
| 360535 ||  || — || September 18, 2003 || Kitt Peak || Spacewatch || — || align=right data-sort-value="0.83" | 830 m || 
|-id=536 bgcolor=#fefefe
| 360536 ||  || — || September 20, 2003 || Socorro || LINEAR || — || align=right | 1.1 km || 
|-id=537 bgcolor=#fefefe
| 360537 ||  || — || September 20, 2003 || Palomar || NEAT || H || align=right data-sort-value="0.81" | 810 m || 
|-id=538 bgcolor=#fefefe
| 360538 ||  || — || September 19, 2003 || Palomar || NEAT || H || align=right | 1.1 km || 
|-id=539 bgcolor=#d6d6d6
| 360539 ||  || — || September 25, 2003 || Palomar || NEAT || — || align=right | 5.5 km || 
|-id=540 bgcolor=#d6d6d6
| 360540 ||  || — || September 21, 2003 || Anderson Mesa || LONEOS || — || align=right | 3.9 km || 
|-id=541 bgcolor=#fefefe
| 360541 ||  || — || September 26, 2003 || Socorro || LINEAR || V || align=right data-sort-value="0.86" | 860 m || 
|-id=542 bgcolor=#fefefe
| 360542 ||  || — || September 25, 2003 || Haleakala || NEAT || KLI || align=right | 2.2 km || 
|-id=543 bgcolor=#fefefe
| 360543 ||  || — || September 28, 2003 || Kitt Peak || Spacewatch || — || align=right data-sort-value="0.98" | 980 m || 
|-id=544 bgcolor=#fefefe
| 360544 ||  || — || September 25, 2003 || Haleakala || NEAT || NYS || align=right data-sort-value="0.66" | 660 m || 
|-id=545 bgcolor=#fefefe
| 360545 ||  || — || September 28, 2003 || Socorro || LINEAR || V || align=right data-sort-value="0.79" | 790 m || 
|-id=546 bgcolor=#fefefe
| 360546 ||  || — || September 20, 2003 || Kitt Peak || Spacewatch || — || align=right | 1.4 km || 
|-id=547 bgcolor=#fefefe
| 360547 ||  || — || September 28, 2003 || Socorro || LINEAR || H || align=right data-sort-value="0.90" | 900 m || 
|-id=548 bgcolor=#fefefe
| 360548 ||  || — || August 31, 2003 || Haleakala || NEAT || ERI || align=right | 1.9 km || 
|-id=549 bgcolor=#fefefe
| 360549 ||  || — || September 28, 2003 || Socorro || LINEAR || V || align=right data-sort-value="0.70" | 700 m || 
|-id=550 bgcolor=#fefefe
| 360550 ||  || — || September 21, 2003 || Kitt Peak || Spacewatch || MAS || align=right data-sort-value="0.67" | 670 m || 
|-id=551 bgcolor=#fefefe
| 360551 ||  || — || September 21, 2003 || Kitt Peak || Spacewatch || MAS || align=right data-sort-value="0.74" | 740 m || 
|-id=552 bgcolor=#fefefe
| 360552 ||  || — || September 27, 2003 || Apache Point || SDSS || — || align=right data-sort-value="0.98" | 980 m || 
|-id=553 bgcolor=#fefefe
| 360553 ||  || — || September 26, 2003 || Apache Point || SDSS || NYS || align=right data-sort-value="0.68" | 680 m || 
|-id=554 bgcolor=#fefefe
| 360554 ||  || — || September 20, 2003 || Kitt Peak || Spacewatch || V || align=right data-sort-value="0.77" | 770 m || 
|-id=555 bgcolor=#fefefe
| 360555 ||  || — || September 22, 2003 || Palomar || NEAT || — || align=right | 1.0 km || 
|-id=556 bgcolor=#E9E9E9
| 360556 ||  || — || September 22, 2003 || Kitt Peak || Spacewatch || — || align=right data-sort-value="0.90" | 900 m || 
|-id=557 bgcolor=#FA8072
| 360557 ||  || — || October 2, 2003 || Kitt Peak || Spacewatch || — || align=right | 1.2 km || 
|-id=558 bgcolor=#d6d6d6
| 360558 ||  || — || September 26, 2003 || Apache Point || SDSS || THB || align=right | 3.4 km || 
|-id=559 bgcolor=#fefefe
| 360559 ||  || — || October 2, 2003 || Goodricke-Pigott || J. W. Kessel || — || align=right | 1.2 km || 
|-id=560 bgcolor=#fefefe
| 360560 ||  || — || October 14, 2003 || Anderson Mesa || LONEOS || — || align=right | 1.5 km || 
|-id=561 bgcolor=#fefefe
| 360561 ||  || — || October 2, 2003 || Kitt Peak || Spacewatch || — || align=right data-sort-value="0.82" | 820 m || 
|-id=562 bgcolor=#d6d6d6
| 360562 ||  || — || October 4, 2003 || Kitt Peak || Spacewatch || — || align=right | 5.1 km || 
|-id=563 bgcolor=#FA8072
| 360563 ||  || — || October 21, 2003 || Kitt Peak || Spacewatch || — || align=right data-sort-value="0.51" | 510 m || 
|-id=564 bgcolor=#fefefe
| 360564 ||  || — || October 18, 2003 || Palomar || NEAT || H || align=right | 1.1 km || 
|-id=565 bgcolor=#fefefe
| 360565 ||  || — || October 18, 2003 || Kitt Peak || Spacewatch || NYS || align=right data-sort-value="0.63" | 630 m || 
|-id=566 bgcolor=#E9E9E9
| 360566 ||  || — || October 19, 2003 || Kitt Peak || Spacewatch || — || align=right | 1.0 km || 
|-id=567 bgcolor=#fefefe
| 360567 ||  || — || October 16, 2003 || Anderson Mesa || LONEOS || — || align=right | 1.3 km || 
|-id=568 bgcolor=#fefefe
| 360568 ||  || — || October 16, 2003 || Palomar || NEAT || — || align=right | 1.6 km || 
|-id=569 bgcolor=#fefefe
| 360569 ||  || — || October 18, 2003 || Kitt Peak || Spacewatch || V || align=right data-sort-value="0.71" | 710 m || 
|-id=570 bgcolor=#fefefe
| 360570 ||  || — || October 18, 2003 || Kitt Peak || Spacewatch || V || align=right data-sort-value="0.95" | 950 m || 
|-id=571 bgcolor=#fefefe
| 360571 ||  || — || October 20, 2003 || Palomar || NEAT || V || align=right data-sort-value="0.86" | 860 m || 
|-id=572 bgcolor=#fefefe
| 360572 ||  || — || October 19, 2003 || Kitt Peak || Spacewatch || V || align=right data-sort-value="0.95" | 950 m || 
|-id=573 bgcolor=#fefefe
| 360573 ||  || — || October 21, 2003 || Kitt Peak || Spacewatch || NYS || align=right data-sort-value="0.84" | 840 m || 
|-id=574 bgcolor=#fefefe
| 360574 ||  || — || October 20, 2003 || Socorro || LINEAR || — || align=right | 1.1 km || 
|-id=575 bgcolor=#E9E9E9
| 360575 ||  || — || October 21, 2003 || Kitt Peak || Spacewatch || — || align=right data-sort-value="0.89" | 890 m || 
|-id=576 bgcolor=#E9E9E9
| 360576 ||  || — || October 22, 2003 || Kitt Peak || Spacewatch || — || align=right data-sort-value="0.98" | 980 m || 
|-id=577 bgcolor=#fefefe
| 360577 ||  || — || October 23, 2003 || Anderson Mesa || LONEOS || — || align=right data-sort-value="0.91" | 910 m || 
|-id=578 bgcolor=#fefefe
| 360578 ||  || — || October 21, 2003 || Kitt Peak || Spacewatch || — || align=right | 1.1 km || 
|-id=579 bgcolor=#fefefe
| 360579 ||  || — || October 21, 2003 || Kitt Peak || Spacewatch || NYS || align=right data-sort-value="0.78" | 780 m || 
|-id=580 bgcolor=#E9E9E9
| 360580 ||  || — || October 24, 2003 || Kitt Peak || Spacewatch || — || align=right data-sort-value="0.99" | 990 m || 
|-id=581 bgcolor=#d6d6d6
| 360581 ||  || — || October 5, 2003 || Kitt Peak || Spacewatch || SYL7:4 || align=right | 5.0 km || 
|-id=582 bgcolor=#fefefe
| 360582 ||  || — || October 19, 2003 || Apache Point || SDSS || — || align=right data-sort-value="0.75" | 750 m || 
|-id=583 bgcolor=#d6d6d6
| 360583 ||  || — || October 8, 2004 || Kitt Peak || Spacewatch || — || align=right | 3.8 km || 
|-id=584 bgcolor=#fefefe
| 360584 ||  || — || October 18, 2003 || Apache Point || SDSS || V || align=right data-sort-value="0.64" | 640 m || 
|-id=585 bgcolor=#fefefe
| 360585 ||  || — || October 19, 2003 || Kitt Peak || Spacewatch || MAS || align=right data-sort-value="0.76" | 760 m || 
|-id=586 bgcolor=#fefefe
| 360586 ||  || — || October 20, 2003 || Kitt Peak || Spacewatch || — || align=right | 1.9 km || 
|-id=587 bgcolor=#fefefe
| 360587 ||  || — || October 23, 2003 || Apache Point || SDSS || — || align=right | 1.1 km || 
|-id=588 bgcolor=#fefefe
| 360588 ||  || — || November 18, 2003 || Kitt Peak || Spacewatch || V || align=right data-sort-value="0.89" | 890 m || 
|-id=589 bgcolor=#fefefe
| 360589 ||  || — || November 20, 2003 || Socorro || LINEAR || V || align=right data-sort-value="0.99" | 990 m || 
|-id=590 bgcolor=#fefefe
| 360590 ||  || — || November 20, 2003 || Socorro || LINEAR || SUL || align=right | 3.0 km || 
|-id=591 bgcolor=#E9E9E9
| 360591 ||  || — || November 21, 2003 || Socorro || LINEAR || BAR || align=right | 1.5 km || 
|-id=592 bgcolor=#fefefe
| 360592 ||  || — || November 23, 2003 || Kitt Peak || Spacewatch || H || align=right data-sort-value="0.93" | 930 m || 
|-id=593 bgcolor=#fefefe
| 360593 ||  || — || November 29, 2003 || Socorro || LINEAR || H || align=right | 1.0 km || 
|-id=594 bgcolor=#E9E9E9
| 360594 ||  || — || December 19, 2003 || Kitt Peak || Spacewatch || — || align=right | 1.2 km || 
|-id=595 bgcolor=#E9E9E9
| 360595 ||  || — || December 17, 2003 || Socorro || LINEAR || — || align=right data-sort-value="0.97" | 970 m || 
|-id=596 bgcolor=#E9E9E9
| 360596 ||  || — || December 19, 2003 || Socorro || LINEAR || ADE || align=right | 1.9 km || 
|-id=597 bgcolor=#E9E9E9
| 360597 ||  || — || December 18, 2003 || Socorro || LINEAR || — || align=right | 2.0 km || 
|-id=598 bgcolor=#E9E9E9
| 360598 ||  || — || December 20, 2003 || Socorro || LINEAR || — || align=right | 1.5 km || 
|-id=599 bgcolor=#E9E9E9
| 360599 ||  || — || December 27, 2003 || Socorro || LINEAR || RAF || align=right | 1.2 km || 
|-id=600 bgcolor=#E9E9E9
| 360600 ||  || — || December 17, 2003 || Kitt Peak || Spacewatch || EUN || align=right | 1.7 km || 
|}

360601–360700 

|-bgcolor=#E9E9E9
| 360601 ||  || — || December 18, 2003 || Socorro || LINEAR || — || align=right | 1.2 km || 
|-id=602 bgcolor=#E9E9E9
| 360602 ||  || — || December 18, 2003 || Kitt Peak || Spacewatch || — || align=right | 1.1 km || 
|-id=603 bgcolor=#E9E9E9
| 360603 ||  || — || January 17, 2004 || Kitt Peak || Spacewatch || — || align=right | 1.5 km || 
|-id=604 bgcolor=#E9E9E9
| 360604 ||  || — || January 21, 2004 || Socorro || LINEAR || — || align=right | 1.7 km || 
|-id=605 bgcolor=#E9E9E9
| 360605 ||  || — || January 22, 2004 || Socorro || LINEAR || — || align=right | 1.3 km || 
|-id=606 bgcolor=#E9E9E9
| 360606 ||  || — || January 22, 2004 || Socorro || LINEAR || — || align=right | 1.9 km || 
|-id=607 bgcolor=#E9E9E9
| 360607 ||  || — || January 27, 2004 || Anderson Mesa || LONEOS || — || align=right | 1.8 km || 
|-id=608 bgcolor=#E9E9E9
| 360608 ||  || — || January 28, 2004 || Kitt Peak || Spacewatch || — || align=right | 1.5 km || 
|-id=609 bgcolor=#E9E9E9
| 360609 ||  || — || January 29, 2004 || Socorro || LINEAR || BAR || align=right | 1.4 km || 
|-id=610 bgcolor=#E9E9E9
| 360610 ||  || — || January 28, 2004 || Catalina || CSS || — || align=right | 1.7 km || 
|-id=611 bgcolor=#E9E9E9
| 360611 ||  || — || January 30, 2004 || Catalina || CSS || — || align=right | 2.0 km || 
|-id=612 bgcolor=#E9E9E9
| 360612 ||  || — || January 16, 2004 || Kitt Peak || Spacewatch || — || align=right data-sort-value="0.96" | 960 m || 
|-id=613 bgcolor=#E9E9E9
| 360613 ||  || — || January 23, 2004 || Socorro || LINEAR || — || align=right | 1.5 km || 
|-id=614 bgcolor=#E9E9E9
| 360614 ||  || — || February 11, 2004 || Palomar || NEAT || — || align=right | 1.6 km || 
|-id=615 bgcolor=#E9E9E9
| 360615 ||  || — || January 28, 2004 || Catalina || CSS || RAF || align=right | 1.1 km || 
|-id=616 bgcolor=#E9E9E9
| 360616 ||  || — || February 11, 2004 || Palomar || NEAT || — || align=right | 1.8 km || 
|-id=617 bgcolor=#E9E9E9
| 360617 ||  || — || February 12, 2004 || Kitt Peak || Spacewatch || MAR || align=right | 1.2 km || 
|-id=618 bgcolor=#E9E9E9
| 360618 ||  || — || February 13, 2004 || Palomar || NEAT || — || align=right | 1.5 km || 
|-id=619 bgcolor=#E9E9E9
| 360619 ||  || — || February 16, 2004 || Kitt Peak || Spacewatch || — || align=right | 2.3 km || 
|-id=620 bgcolor=#E9E9E9
| 360620 ||  || — || February 18, 2004 || Socorro || LINEAR || — || align=right | 1.9 km || 
|-id=621 bgcolor=#E9E9E9
| 360621 ||  || — || February 22, 2004 || Kitt Peak || Spacewatch || EUN || align=right | 1.3 km || 
|-id=622 bgcolor=#E9E9E9
| 360622 ||  || — || February 12, 2004 || Kitt Peak || Spacewatch || — || align=right | 1.2 km || 
|-id=623 bgcolor=#E9E9E9
| 360623 ||  || — || February 12, 2004 || Kitt Peak || Spacewatch || — || align=right | 1.4 km || 
|-id=624 bgcolor=#E9E9E9
| 360624 ||  || — || March 15, 2004 || Palomar || NEAT || JUN || align=right | 1.4 km || 
|-id=625 bgcolor=#E9E9E9
| 360625 ||  || — || March 12, 2004 || Palomar || NEAT || — || align=right | 3.1 km || 
|-id=626 bgcolor=#E9E9E9
| 360626 ||  || — || March 15, 2004 || Kitt Peak || Spacewatch || — || align=right | 2.6 km || 
|-id=627 bgcolor=#E9E9E9
| 360627 ||  || — || March 15, 2004 || Kitt Peak || Spacewatch || — || align=right | 2.5 km || 
|-id=628 bgcolor=#E9E9E9
| 360628 ||  || — || March 15, 2004 || Socorro || LINEAR || — || align=right | 2.1 km || 
|-id=629 bgcolor=#E9E9E9
| 360629 ||  || — || March 15, 2004 || Socorro || LINEAR || — || align=right | 2.5 km || 
|-id=630 bgcolor=#E9E9E9
| 360630 ||  || — || March 15, 2004 || Socorro || LINEAR || JUN || align=right | 1.2 km || 
|-id=631 bgcolor=#E9E9E9
| 360631 ||  || — || June 11, 2000 || Haleakala || NEAT || GAL || align=right | 2.2 km || 
|-id=632 bgcolor=#E9E9E9
| 360632 ||  || — || March 17, 2004 || Kitt Peak || Spacewatch || ADE || align=right | 2.3 km || 
|-id=633 bgcolor=#E9E9E9
| 360633 ||  || — || March 17, 2004 || Kitt Peak || Spacewatch || — || align=right | 2.1 km || 
|-id=634 bgcolor=#E9E9E9
| 360634 ||  || — || March 23, 2004 || Socorro || LINEAR || — || align=right | 2.2 km || 
|-id=635 bgcolor=#E9E9E9
| 360635 ||  || — || March 23, 2004 || Socorro || LINEAR || EUN || align=right | 1.3 km || 
|-id=636 bgcolor=#E9E9E9
| 360636 ||  || — || March 21, 2004 || Kitt Peak || Spacewatch || — || align=right | 2.8 km || 
|-id=637 bgcolor=#E9E9E9
| 360637 ||  || — || March 29, 2004 || Kitt Peak || Spacewatch || — || align=right | 2.1 km || 
|-id=638 bgcolor=#E9E9E9
| 360638 ||  || — || March 31, 2004 || Kitt Peak || Spacewatch || — || align=right | 1.8 km || 
|-id=639 bgcolor=#E9E9E9
| 360639 ||  || — || April 13, 2004 || Kitt Peak || Spacewatch || — || align=right | 1.8 km || 
|-id=640 bgcolor=#E9E9E9
| 360640 ||  || — || April 16, 2004 || Socorro || LINEAR || JUN || align=right | 1.1 km || 
|-id=641 bgcolor=#E9E9E9
| 360641 ||  || — || April 19, 2004 || Socorro || LINEAR || — || align=right | 2.7 km || 
|-id=642 bgcolor=#FA8072
| 360642 ||  || — || April 23, 2004 || Socorro || LINEAR || — || align=right | 2.2 km || 
|-id=643 bgcolor=#FA8072
| 360643 ||  || — || April 16, 2004 || Siding Spring || SSS || — || align=right | 1.1 km || 
|-id=644 bgcolor=#E9E9E9
| 360644 ||  || — || May 15, 2004 || Socorro || LINEAR || INO || align=right | 1.7 km || 
|-id=645 bgcolor=#E9E9E9
| 360645 ||  || — || April 17, 2004 || Socorro || LINEAR || — || align=right | 3.1 km || 
|-id=646 bgcolor=#E9E9E9
| 360646 ||  || — || June 12, 2004 || Socorro || LINEAR || — || align=right | 3.4 km || 
|-id=647 bgcolor=#E9E9E9
| 360647 ||  || — || June 12, 2004 || Socorro || LINEAR || — || align=right | 3.0 km || 
|-id=648 bgcolor=#d6d6d6
| 360648 ||  || — || July 12, 2004 || Palomar || NEAT || — || align=right | 4.7 km || 
|-id=649 bgcolor=#d6d6d6
| 360649 ||  || — || July 18, 2004 || Reedy Creek || J. Broughton || — || align=right | 3.4 km || 
|-id=650 bgcolor=#d6d6d6
| 360650 ||  || — || August 6, 2004 || Palomar || NEAT || — || align=right | 4.1 km || 
|-id=651 bgcolor=#fefefe
| 360651 ||  || — || August 21, 2004 || Reedy Creek || J. Broughton || — || align=right data-sort-value="0.77" | 770 m || 
|-id=652 bgcolor=#d6d6d6
| 360652 ||  || — || August 20, 2004 || Kitt Peak || Spacewatch || — || align=right | 3.6 km || 
|-id=653 bgcolor=#fefefe
| 360653 ||  || — || September 6, 2004 || Goodricke-Pigott || Goodricke-Pigott Obs. || FLO || align=right data-sort-value="0.71" | 710 m || 
|-id=654 bgcolor=#fefefe
| 360654 ||  || — || September 7, 2004 || Socorro || LINEAR || — || align=right | 2.6 km || 
|-id=655 bgcolor=#d6d6d6
| 360655 ||  || — || September 7, 2004 || Kitt Peak || Spacewatch || — || align=right | 3.0 km || 
|-id=656 bgcolor=#d6d6d6
| 360656 ||  || — || September 7, 2004 || Socorro || LINEAR || EUP || align=right | 4.6 km || 
|-id=657 bgcolor=#d6d6d6
| 360657 ||  || — || September 6, 2004 || Siding Spring || SSS || — || align=right | 3.3 km || 
|-id=658 bgcolor=#FA8072
| 360658 ||  || — || September 8, 2004 || Socorro || LINEAR || — || align=right data-sort-value="0.79" | 790 m || 
|-id=659 bgcolor=#d6d6d6
| 360659 ||  || — || September 8, 2004 || Socorro || LINEAR || — || align=right | 3.3 km || 
|-id=660 bgcolor=#fefefe
| 360660 ||  || — || September 8, 2004 || Socorro || LINEAR || FLO || align=right data-sort-value="0.70" | 700 m || 
|-id=661 bgcolor=#fefefe
| 360661 ||  || — || September 8, 2004 || Socorro || LINEAR || FLO || align=right data-sort-value="0.74" | 740 m || 
|-id=662 bgcolor=#fefefe
| 360662 ||  || — || September 8, 2004 || Palomar || NEAT || FLO || align=right data-sort-value="0.66" | 660 m || 
|-id=663 bgcolor=#d6d6d6
| 360663 ||  || — || September 7, 2004 || Kitt Peak || Spacewatch || — || align=right | 3.2 km || 
|-id=664 bgcolor=#d6d6d6
| 360664 ||  || — || September 7, 2004 || Kitt Peak || Spacewatch || — || align=right | 2.8 km || 
|-id=665 bgcolor=#fefefe
| 360665 ||  || — || September 9, 2004 || Socorro || LINEAR || FLO || align=right data-sort-value="0.60" | 600 m || 
|-id=666 bgcolor=#d6d6d6
| 360666 ||  || — || September 10, 2004 || Socorro || LINEAR || EUP || align=right | 4.8 km || 
|-id=667 bgcolor=#fefefe
| 360667 ||  || — || September 11, 2004 || Kitt Peak || Spacewatch || — || align=right data-sort-value="0.70" | 700 m || 
|-id=668 bgcolor=#d6d6d6
| 360668 ||  || — || September 7, 2004 || Palomar || NEAT || — || align=right | 3.3 km || 
|-id=669 bgcolor=#d6d6d6
| 360669 ||  || — || September 9, 2004 || Kitt Peak || Spacewatch || — || align=right | 2.7 km || 
|-id=670 bgcolor=#d6d6d6
| 360670 ||  || — || September 10, 2004 || Socorro || LINEAR || 7:4* || align=right | 4.8 km || 
|-id=671 bgcolor=#d6d6d6
| 360671 ||  || — || September 10, 2004 || Socorro || LINEAR || TIR || align=right | 3.6 km || 
|-id=672 bgcolor=#d6d6d6
| 360672 ||  || — || September 10, 2004 || Socorro || LINEAR || TEL || align=right | 1.7 km || 
|-id=673 bgcolor=#d6d6d6
| 360673 ||  || — || September 11, 2004 || Socorro || LINEAR || — || align=right | 4.0 km || 
|-id=674 bgcolor=#d6d6d6
| 360674 ||  || — || September 11, 2004 || Socorro || LINEAR || EUP || align=right | 5.3 km || 
|-id=675 bgcolor=#d6d6d6
| 360675 ||  || — || September 9, 2004 || Socorro || LINEAR || — || align=right | 3.4 km || 
|-id=676 bgcolor=#fefefe
| 360676 ||  || — || September 9, 2004 || Socorro || LINEAR || — || align=right data-sort-value="0.80" | 800 m || 
|-id=677 bgcolor=#d6d6d6
| 360677 ||  || — || September 10, 2004 || Kitt Peak || Spacewatch || — || align=right | 2.5 km || 
|-id=678 bgcolor=#d6d6d6
| 360678 ||  || — || September 10, 2004 || Kitt Peak || Spacewatch || — || align=right | 3.7 km || 
|-id=679 bgcolor=#d6d6d6
| 360679 ||  || — || September 6, 2004 || Palomar || NEAT || TIR || align=right | 4.0 km || 
|-id=680 bgcolor=#d6d6d6
| 360680 ||  || — || September 11, 2004 || Kitt Peak || Spacewatch || — || align=right | 3.3 km || 
|-id=681 bgcolor=#d6d6d6
| 360681 ||  || — || September 11, 2004 || Kitt Peak || Spacewatch || — || align=right | 2.4 km || 
|-id=682 bgcolor=#d6d6d6
| 360682 ||  || — || September 11, 2004 || Socorro || LINEAR || — || align=right | 4.1 km || 
|-id=683 bgcolor=#d6d6d6
| 360683 ||  || — || September 11, 2004 || Kitt Peak || Spacewatch || — || align=right | 2.5 km || 
|-id=684 bgcolor=#d6d6d6
| 360684 ||  || — || September 14, 2004 || Socorro || LINEAR || EOS || align=right | 2.6 km || 
|-id=685 bgcolor=#d6d6d6
| 360685 ||  || — || September 12, 2004 || Kitt Peak || Spacewatch || — || align=right | 3.0 km || 
|-id=686 bgcolor=#d6d6d6
| 360686 ||  || — || September 15, 2004 || Anderson Mesa || LONEOS || — || align=right | 3.2 km || 
|-id=687 bgcolor=#d6d6d6
| 360687 ||  || — || September 7, 2004 || Socorro || LINEAR || — || align=right | 3.4 km || 
|-id=688 bgcolor=#d6d6d6
| 360688 ||  || — || September 9, 2004 || Kitt Peak || Spacewatch || — || align=right | 3.0 km || 
|-id=689 bgcolor=#fefefe
| 360689 ||  || — || September 18, 2004 || Socorro || LINEAR || FLO || align=right data-sort-value="0.64" | 640 m || 
|-id=690 bgcolor=#FA8072
| 360690 ||  || — || September 17, 2004 || Socorro || LINEAR || — || align=right data-sort-value="0.89" | 890 m || 
|-id=691 bgcolor=#fefefe
| 360691 ||  || — || September 17, 2004 || Socorro || LINEAR || — || align=right data-sort-value="0.87" | 870 m || 
|-id=692 bgcolor=#d6d6d6
| 360692 ||  || — || September 17, 2004 || Kitt Peak || Spacewatch || — || align=right | 3.2 km || 
|-id=693 bgcolor=#fefefe
| 360693 ||  || — || September 18, 2004 || Socorro || LINEAR || FLO || align=right data-sort-value="0.73" | 730 m || 
|-id=694 bgcolor=#fefefe
| 360694 ||  || — || September 21, 2004 || Socorro || LINEAR || — || align=right data-sort-value="0.75" | 750 m || 
|-id=695 bgcolor=#d6d6d6
| 360695 ||  || — || September 21, 2004 || Socorro || LINEAR || — || align=right | 3.6 km || 
|-id=696 bgcolor=#d6d6d6
| 360696 ||  || — || September 16, 2004 || Anderson Mesa || LONEOS || — || align=right | 3.6 km || 
|-id=697 bgcolor=#fefefe
| 360697 ||  || — || September 8, 2004 || Socorro || LINEAR || PHO || align=right | 1.1 km || 
|-id=698 bgcolor=#FA8072
| 360698 ||  || — || October 9, 2004 || Anderson Mesa || LONEOS || — || align=right data-sort-value="0.81" | 810 m || 
|-id=699 bgcolor=#fefefe
| 360699 ||  || — || September 22, 2004 || Kitt Peak || Spacewatch || NYS || align=right data-sort-value="0.56" | 560 m || 
|-id=700 bgcolor=#fefefe
| 360700 ||  || — || October 11, 2004 || Kitt Peak || Spacewatch || FLO || align=right data-sort-value="0.56" | 560 m || 
|}

360701–360800 

|-bgcolor=#fefefe
| 360701 ||  || — || October 4, 2004 || Kitt Peak || Spacewatch || — || align=right data-sort-value="0.84" | 840 m || 
|-id=702 bgcolor=#fefefe
| 360702 ||  || — || October 4, 2004 || Kitt Peak || Spacewatch || FLO || align=right data-sort-value="0.77" | 770 m || 
|-id=703 bgcolor=#fefefe
| 360703 ||  || — || October 4, 2004 || Kitt Peak || Spacewatch || NYS || align=right data-sort-value="0.71" | 710 m || 
|-id=704 bgcolor=#fefefe
| 360704 ||  || — || October 4, 2004 || Kitt Peak || Spacewatch || — || align=right data-sort-value="0.80" | 800 m || 
|-id=705 bgcolor=#fefefe
| 360705 ||  || — || October 4, 2004 || Kitt Peak || Spacewatch || NYS || align=right data-sort-value="0.70" | 700 m || 
|-id=706 bgcolor=#d6d6d6
| 360706 ||  || — || October 4, 2004 || Kitt Peak || Spacewatch || — || align=right | 5.1 km || 
|-id=707 bgcolor=#d6d6d6
| 360707 ||  || — || October 4, 2004 || Kitt Peak || Spacewatch || 7:4 || align=right | 4.6 km || 
|-id=708 bgcolor=#d6d6d6
| 360708 ||  || — || October 5, 2004 || Anderson Mesa || LONEOS || — || align=right | 4.3 km || 
|-id=709 bgcolor=#fefefe
| 360709 ||  || — || October 6, 2004 || Kitt Peak || Spacewatch || — || align=right | 1.0 km || 
|-id=710 bgcolor=#fefefe
| 360710 ||  || — || October 4, 2004 || Anderson Mesa || LONEOS || — || align=right | 1.0 km || 
|-id=711 bgcolor=#fefefe
| 360711 ||  || — || October 5, 2004 || Kitt Peak || Spacewatch || — || align=right data-sort-value="0.78" | 780 m || 
|-id=712 bgcolor=#d6d6d6
| 360712 ||  || — || October 5, 2004 || Kitt Peak || Spacewatch || — || align=right | 3.0 km || 
|-id=713 bgcolor=#fefefe
| 360713 ||  || — || October 6, 2004 || Palomar || NEAT || — || align=right | 1.2 km || 
|-id=714 bgcolor=#d6d6d6
| 360714 ||  || — || October 7, 2004 || Kitt Peak || Spacewatch || EOS || align=right | 2.0 km || 
|-id=715 bgcolor=#d6d6d6
| 360715 ||  || — || October 7, 2004 || Socorro || LINEAR || — || align=right | 2.5 km || 
|-id=716 bgcolor=#fefefe
| 360716 ||  || — || October 7, 2004 || Socorro || LINEAR || — || align=right | 1.00 km || 
|-id=717 bgcolor=#d6d6d6
| 360717 ||  || — || November 29, 1999 || Kitt Peak || Spacewatch || — || align=right | 3.6 km || 
|-id=718 bgcolor=#d6d6d6
| 360718 ||  || — || October 7, 2004 || Socorro || LINEAR || — || align=right | 3.6 km || 
|-id=719 bgcolor=#fefefe
| 360719 ||  || — || October 7, 2004 || Anderson Mesa || LONEOS || V || align=right data-sort-value="0.79" | 790 m || 
|-id=720 bgcolor=#d6d6d6
| 360720 ||  || — || October 7, 2004 || Palomar || NEAT || TIR || align=right | 3.2 km || 
|-id=721 bgcolor=#fefefe
| 360721 ||  || — || October 8, 2004 || Anderson Mesa || LONEOS || ERI || align=right | 1.7 km || 
|-id=722 bgcolor=#d6d6d6
| 360722 ||  || — || October 9, 2004 || Anderson Mesa || LONEOS || — || align=right | 4.4 km || 
|-id=723 bgcolor=#fefefe
| 360723 ||  || — || October 6, 2004 || Kitt Peak || Spacewatch || — || align=right data-sort-value="0.76" | 760 m || 
|-id=724 bgcolor=#fefefe
| 360724 ||  || — || October 7, 2004 || Kitt Peak || Spacewatch || FLO || align=right data-sort-value="0.56" | 560 m || 
|-id=725 bgcolor=#fefefe
| 360725 ||  || — || October 7, 2004 || Kitt Peak || Spacewatch || FLO || align=right data-sort-value="0.73" | 730 m || 
|-id=726 bgcolor=#d6d6d6
| 360726 ||  || — || October 8, 2004 || Kitt Peak || Spacewatch || — || align=right | 2.6 km || 
|-id=727 bgcolor=#d6d6d6
| 360727 ||  || — || October 8, 2004 || Kitt Peak || Spacewatch || — || align=right | 2.9 km || 
|-id=728 bgcolor=#fefefe
| 360728 ||  || — || October 9, 2004 || Kitt Peak || Spacewatch || — || align=right data-sort-value="0.84" | 840 m || 
|-id=729 bgcolor=#d6d6d6
| 360729 ||  || — || October 7, 2004 || Socorro || LINEAR || — || align=right | 4.3 km || 
|-id=730 bgcolor=#d6d6d6
| 360730 ||  || — || October 9, 2004 || Kitt Peak || Spacewatch || — || align=right | 4.3 km || 
|-id=731 bgcolor=#fefefe
| 360731 ||  || — || October 7, 2004 || Socorro || LINEAR || — || align=right data-sort-value="0.94" | 940 m || 
|-id=732 bgcolor=#fefefe
| 360732 ||  || — || October 8, 2004 || Kitt Peak || Spacewatch || — || align=right data-sort-value="0.77" | 770 m || 
|-id=733 bgcolor=#fefefe
| 360733 ||  || — || October 9, 2004 || Socorro || LINEAR || — || align=right data-sort-value="0.92" | 920 m || 
|-id=734 bgcolor=#fefefe
| 360734 ||  || — || October 11, 2004 || Kitt Peak || Spacewatch || — || align=right data-sort-value="0.74" | 740 m || 
|-id=735 bgcolor=#d6d6d6
| 360735 ||  || — || October 4, 2004 || Kitt Peak || Spacewatch || — || align=right | 3.3 km || 
|-id=736 bgcolor=#d6d6d6
| 360736 ||  || — || August 11, 2004 || Socorro || LINEAR || — || align=right | 3.6 km || 
|-id=737 bgcolor=#fefefe
| 360737 ||  || — || October 14, 2004 || Kitt Peak || Spacewatch || — || align=right data-sort-value="0.96" | 960 m || 
|-id=738 bgcolor=#d6d6d6
| 360738 ||  || — || October 16, 2004 || Pla D'Arguines || R. Ferrando || — || align=right | 2.9 km || 
|-id=739 bgcolor=#fefefe
| 360739 ||  || — || October 15, 2004 || Mount Lemmon || Mount Lemmon Survey || NYS || align=right data-sort-value="0.64" | 640 m || 
|-id=740 bgcolor=#fefefe
| 360740 ||  || — || October 21, 2004 || Socorro || LINEAR || — || align=right data-sort-value="0.98" | 980 m || 
|-id=741 bgcolor=#d6d6d6
| 360741 ||  || — || November 3, 2004 || Palomar || NEAT || HYG || align=right | 3.7 km || 
|-id=742 bgcolor=#d6d6d6
| 360742 ||  || — || November 4, 2004 || Kitt Peak || Spacewatch || — || align=right | 4.6 km || 
|-id=743 bgcolor=#fefefe
| 360743 ||  || — || November 5, 2004 || Palomar || NEAT || — || align=right | 1.1 km || 
|-id=744 bgcolor=#d6d6d6
| 360744 ||  || — || October 23, 2004 || Kitt Peak || Spacewatch || — || align=right | 4.5 km || 
|-id=745 bgcolor=#d6d6d6
| 360745 ||  || — || November 3, 2004 || Kitt Peak || Spacewatch || — || align=right | 3.8 km || 
|-id=746 bgcolor=#d6d6d6
| 360746 ||  || — || November 4, 2004 || Kitt Peak || Spacewatch || — || align=right | 4.9 km || 
|-id=747 bgcolor=#d6d6d6
| 360747 ||  || — || November 4, 2004 || Catalina || CSS || — || align=right | 4.4 km || 
|-id=748 bgcolor=#fefefe
| 360748 ||  || — || November 7, 2004 || Socorro || LINEAR || — || align=right | 1.2 km || 
|-id=749 bgcolor=#fefefe
| 360749 ||  || — || November 12, 2004 || Catalina || CSS || — || align=right | 1.0 km || 
|-id=750 bgcolor=#fefefe
| 360750 ||  || — || November 19, 2004 || Socorro || LINEAR || — || align=right data-sort-value="0.73" | 730 m || 
|-id=751 bgcolor=#fefefe
| 360751 ||  || — || December 10, 2004 || Socorro || LINEAR || — || align=right | 1.0 km || 
|-id=752 bgcolor=#fefefe
| 360752 ||  || — || December 10, 2004 || Kitt Peak || Spacewatch || — || align=right data-sort-value="0.98" | 980 m || 
|-id=753 bgcolor=#fefefe
| 360753 ||  || — || December 10, 2004 || Socorro || LINEAR || — || align=right data-sort-value="0.81" | 810 m || 
|-id=754 bgcolor=#fefefe
| 360754 ||  || — || December 11, 2004 || Socorro || LINEAR || FLO || align=right data-sort-value="0.72" | 720 m || 
|-id=755 bgcolor=#fefefe
| 360755 ||  || — || December 11, 2004 || Socorro || LINEAR || NYS || align=right data-sort-value="0.75" | 750 m || 
|-id=756 bgcolor=#fefefe
| 360756 ||  || — || December 10, 2004 || Socorro || LINEAR || — || align=right | 1.1 km || 
|-id=757 bgcolor=#fefefe
| 360757 ||  || — || December 2, 2004 || Kitt Peak || Spacewatch || — || align=right | 1.1 km || 
|-id=758 bgcolor=#fefefe
| 360758 ||  || — || December 15, 2004 || Socorro || LINEAR || — || align=right data-sort-value="0.84" | 840 m || 
|-id=759 bgcolor=#fefefe
| 360759 ||  || — || December 3, 2004 || Anderson Mesa || LONEOS || — || align=right | 1.2 km || 
|-id=760 bgcolor=#fefefe
| 360760 ||  || — || November 3, 2004 || Palomar || NEAT || — || align=right | 1.1 km || 
|-id=761 bgcolor=#fefefe
| 360761 ||  || — || December 15, 2004 || Campo Imperatore || CINEOS || NYS || align=right data-sort-value="0.84" | 840 m || 
|-id=762 bgcolor=#fefefe
| 360762 FRIPON || 2005 AT ||  || January 4, 2005 || Vicques || Jura Obs. || MAS || align=right data-sort-value="0.83" | 830 m || 
|-id=763 bgcolor=#fefefe
| 360763 ||  || — || January 1, 2005 || Catalina || CSS || — || align=right | 1.2 km || 
|-id=764 bgcolor=#E9E9E9
| 360764 ||  || — || December 16, 2004 || Uccle || T. Pauwels || — || align=right | 1.1 km || 
|-id=765 bgcolor=#fefefe
| 360765 ||  || — || January 17, 2005 || Socorro || LINEAR || H || align=right data-sort-value="0.94" | 940 m || 
|-id=766 bgcolor=#E9E9E9
| 360766 ||  || — || January 16, 2005 || Socorro || LINEAR || EUN || align=right | 1.5 km || 
|-id=767 bgcolor=#fefefe
| 360767 ||  || — || January 16, 2005 || Mauna Kea || C. Veillet || — || align=right | 1.2 km || 
|-id=768 bgcolor=#fefefe
| 360768 ||  || — || January 16, 2005 || Mauna Kea || C. Veillet || — || align=right | 1.0 km || 
|-id=769 bgcolor=#fefefe
| 360769 ||  || — || February 1, 2005 || Kitt Peak || Spacewatch || H || align=right | 1.1 km || 
|-id=770 bgcolor=#fefefe
| 360770 ||  || — || February 2, 2005 || Kitt Peak || Spacewatch || MAS || align=right data-sort-value="0.72" | 720 m || 
|-id=771 bgcolor=#fefefe
| 360771 ||  || — || February 2, 2005 || Kitt Peak || Spacewatch || — || align=right data-sort-value="0.89" | 890 m || 
|-id=772 bgcolor=#fefefe
| 360772 ||  || — || February 2, 2005 || Socorro || LINEAR || — || align=right | 1.1 km || 
|-id=773 bgcolor=#fefefe
| 360773 ||  || — || February 1, 2005 || Kitt Peak || Spacewatch || — || align=right data-sort-value="0.73" | 730 m || 
|-id=774 bgcolor=#fefefe
| 360774 ||  || — || February 2, 2005 || Kitt Peak || Spacewatch || V || align=right data-sort-value="0.76" | 760 m || 
|-id=775 bgcolor=#E9E9E9
| 360775 ||  || — || March 3, 2005 || Catalina || CSS || — || align=right | 1.1 km || 
|-id=776 bgcolor=#fefefe
| 360776 ||  || — || March 4, 2005 || Socorro || LINEAR || — || align=right | 1.0 km || 
|-id=777 bgcolor=#fefefe
| 360777 ||  || — || March 3, 2005 || Kitt Peak || Spacewatch || — || align=right data-sort-value="0.86" | 860 m || 
|-id=778 bgcolor=#fefefe
| 360778 ||  || — || March 9, 2005 || Anderson Mesa || LONEOS || H || align=right data-sort-value="0.95" | 950 m || 
|-id=779 bgcolor=#d6d6d6
| 360779 ||  || — || March 9, 2005 || Mount Lemmon || Mount Lemmon Survey || 3:2 || align=right | 3.8 km || 
|-id=780 bgcolor=#fefefe
| 360780 ||  || — || March 10, 2005 || Anderson Mesa || LONEOS || — || align=right | 1.1 km || 
|-id=781 bgcolor=#fefefe
| 360781 ||  || — || March 8, 2005 || Socorro || LINEAR || H || align=right data-sort-value="0.86" | 860 m || 
|-id=782 bgcolor=#E9E9E9
| 360782 ||  || — || March 10, 2005 || Anderson Mesa || LONEOS || — || align=right | 1.9 km || 
|-id=783 bgcolor=#fefefe
| 360783 ||  || — || March 10, 2005 || Kitt Peak || Spacewatch || H || align=right data-sort-value="0.83" | 830 m || 
|-id=784 bgcolor=#E9E9E9
| 360784 ||  || — || March 8, 2005 || Mount Lemmon || Mount Lemmon Survey || — || align=right data-sort-value="0.92" | 920 m || 
|-id=785 bgcolor=#fefefe
| 360785 ||  || — || March 22, 2005 || Socorro || LINEAR || H || align=right | 1.1 km || 
|-id=786 bgcolor=#fefefe
| 360786 ||  || — || April 1, 2005 || Kitt Peak || Spacewatch || NYS || align=right data-sort-value="0.83" | 830 m || 
|-id=787 bgcolor=#fefefe
| 360787 ||  || — || April 2, 2005 || Mount Lemmon || Mount Lemmon Survey || — || align=right data-sort-value="0.99" | 990 m || 
|-id=788 bgcolor=#fefefe
| 360788 ||  || — || April 4, 2005 || Socorro || LINEAR || H || align=right | 1.0 km || 
|-id=789 bgcolor=#E9E9E9
| 360789 ||  || — || April 4, 2005 || Mount Lemmon || Mount Lemmon Survey || MAR || align=right | 1.6 km || 
|-id=790 bgcolor=#fefefe
| 360790 ||  || — || April 5, 2005 || Mount Lemmon || Mount Lemmon Survey || NYS || align=right data-sort-value="0.66" | 660 m || 
|-id=791 bgcolor=#fefefe
| 360791 ||  || — || April 5, 2005 || Mount Lemmon || Mount Lemmon Survey || LCI || align=right | 1.3 km || 
|-id=792 bgcolor=#E9E9E9
| 360792 ||  || — || April 6, 2005 || Mount Lemmon || Mount Lemmon Survey || — || align=right | 1.2 km || 
|-id=793 bgcolor=#E9E9E9
| 360793 ||  || — || April 3, 2005 || Palomar || NEAT || RAF || align=right | 1.4 km || 
|-id=794 bgcolor=#E9E9E9
| 360794 ||  || — || April 4, 2005 || Mount Lemmon || Mount Lemmon Survey || — || align=right | 1.2 km || 
|-id=795 bgcolor=#E9E9E9
| 360795 ||  || — || April 7, 2005 || Mount Lemmon || Mount Lemmon Survey || — || align=right data-sort-value="0.86" | 860 m || 
|-id=796 bgcolor=#d6d6d6
| 360796 ||  || — || March 10, 2005 || Mount Lemmon || Mount Lemmon Survey || SHU3:2 || align=right | 5.2 km || 
|-id=797 bgcolor=#fefefe
| 360797 ||  || — || April 9, 2005 || Catalina || CSS || H || align=right | 1.1 km || 
|-id=798 bgcolor=#fefefe
| 360798 ||  || — || April 4, 2005 || Catalina || CSS || H || align=right | 1.1 km || 
|-id=799 bgcolor=#E9E9E9
| 360799 ||  || — || April 10, 2005 || Kitt Peak || Spacewatch || — || align=right | 1.2 km || 
|-id=800 bgcolor=#E9E9E9
| 360800 ||  || — || April 11, 2005 || Kitt Peak || Spacewatch || — || align=right | 1.1 km || 
|}

360801–360900 

|-bgcolor=#E9E9E9
| 360801 ||  || — || April 10, 2005 || Mount Lemmon || Mount Lemmon Survey || — || align=right | 1.0 km || 
|-id=802 bgcolor=#fefefe
| 360802 ||  || — || April 12, 2005 || Anderson Mesa || LONEOS || H || align=right data-sort-value="0.86" | 860 m || 
|-id=803 bgcolor=#E9E9E9
| 360803 ||  || — || April 12, 2005 || Kitt Peak || Spacewatch || — || align=right data-sort-value="0.81" | 810 m || 
|-id=804 bgcolor=#fefefe
| 360804 ||  || — || April 12, 2005 || Kitt Peak || M. W. Buie || — || align=right data-sort-value="0.73" | 730 m || 
|-id=805 bgcolor=#E9E9E9
| 360805 ||  || — || April 17, 2005 || Kitt Peak || Spacewatch || — || align=right data-sort-value="0.90" | 900 m || 
|-id=806 bgcolor=#fefefe
| 360806 ||  || — || May 2, 2005 || Catalina || CSS || H || align=right | 1.0 km || 
|-id=807 bgcolor=#E9E9E9
| 360807 ||  || — || May 4, 2005 || Kitt Peak || Spacewatch || — || align=right | 2.0 km || 
|-id=808 bgcolor=#d6d6d6
| 360808 ||  || — || May 4, 2005 || Kitt Peak || Spacewatch || 3:2 || align=right | 6.6 km || 
|-id=809 bgcolor=#fefefe
| 360809 ||  || — || May 3, 2005 || Kitt Peak || DLS || H || align=right | 1.0 km || 
|-id=810 bgcolor=#E9E9E9
| 360810 ||  || — || May 6, 2005 || Socorro || LINEAR || — || align=right | 2.0 km || 
|-id=811 bgcolor=#E9E9E9
| 360811 ||  || — || May 6, 2005 || Socorro || LINEAR || — || align=right | 1.3 km || 
|-id=812 bgcolor=#E9E9E9
| 360812 ||  || — || May 8, 2005 || Kitt Peak || Spacewatch || — || align=right data-sort-value="0.82" | 820 m || 
|-id=813 bgcolor=#E9E9E9
| 360813 ||  || — || May 8, 2005 || Mount Lemmon || Mount Lemmon Survey || — || align=right | 3.0 km || 
|-id=814 bgcolor=#fefefe
| 360814 ||  || — || May 10, 2005 || Mount Lemmon || Mount Lemmon Survey || MAS || align=right data-sort-value="0.85" | 850 m || 
|-id=815 bgcolor=#E9E9E9
| 360815 ||  || — || May 8, 2005 || Mount Lemmon || Mount Lemmon Survey || — || align=right | 1.1 km || 
|-id=816 bgcolor=#E9E9E9
| 360816 ||  || — || May 10, 2005 || Kitt Peak || Spacewatch || — || align=right | 1.6 km || 
|-id=817 bgcolor=#E9E9E9
| 360817 ||  || — || May 11, 2005 || Kitt Peak || Spacewatch || EUN || align=right | 1.3 km || 
|-id=818 bgcolor=#E9E9E9
| 360818 ||  || — || May 13, 2005 || Kitt Peak || Spacewatch || — || align=right | 1.9 km || 
|-id=819 bgcolor=#E9E9E9
| 360819 ||  || — || May 14, 2005 || Catalina || CSS || BAR || align=right | 1.5 km || 
|-id=820 bgcolor=#E9E9E9
| 360820 ||  || — || May 3, 2005 || Kitt Peak || Spacewatch || RAF || align=right | 1.1 km || 
|-id=821 bgcolor=#E9E9E9
| 360821 ||  || — || May 14, 2005 || Catalina || CSS || — || align=right | 1.4 km || 
|-id=822 bgcolor=#E9E9E9
| 360822 ||  || — || May 19, 2005 || Palomar || NEAT || GER || align=right | 1.7 km || 
|-id=823 bgcolor=#E9E9E9
| 360823 ||  || — || May 19, 2005 || Palomar || NEAT || — || align=right | 1.2 km || 
|-id=824 bgcolor=#E9E9E9
| 360824 ||  || — || May 28, 2005 || Campo Imperatore || CINEOS || — || align=right data-sort-value="0.99" | 990 m || 
|-id=825 bgcolor=#E9E9E9
| 360825 ||  || — || June 1, 2005 || Mount Lemmon || Mount Lemmon Survey || — || align=right | 1.1 km || 
|-id=826 bgcolor=#E9E9E9
| 360826 ||  || — || June 3, 2005 || Kitt Peak || Spacewatch || — || align=right | 1.3 km || 
|-id=827 bgcolor=#E9E9E9
| 360827 ||  || — || June 4, 2005 || Kitt Peak || Spacewatch || KON || align=right | 2.2 km || 
|-id=828 bgcolor=#E9E9E9
| 360828 ||  || — || June 4, 2005 || Kitt Peak || Spacewatch || — || align=right | 1.0 km || 
|-id=829 bgcolor=#FA8072
| 360829 ||  || — || June 10, 2005 || Catalina || CSS || — || align=right | 2.3 km || 
|-id=830 bgcolor=#E9E9E9
| 360830 ||  || — || June 10, 2005 || Kitt Peak || Spacewatch || — || align=right | 1.1 km || 
|-id=831 bgcolor=#E9E9E9
| 360831 ||  || — || June 13, 2005 || Mount Lemmon || Mount Lemmon Survey || — || align=right | 1.6 km || 
|-id=832 bgcolor=#E9E9E9
| 360832 ||  || — || June 3, 2005 || Siding Spring || SSS || — || align=right | 2.3 km || 
|-id=833 bgcolor=#E9E9E9
| 360833 ||  || — || June 28, 2005 || Palomar || NEAT || — || align=right | 1.9 km || 
|-id=834 bgcolor=#E9E9E9
| 360834 ||  || — || June 29, 2005 || Kitt Peak || Spacewatch || — || align=right | 1.6 km || 
|-id=835 bgcolor=#E9E9E9
| 360835 ||  || — || June 30, 2005 || Palomar || NEAT || EUN || align=right | 1.4 km || 
|-id=836 bgcolor=#E9E9E9
| 360836 ||  || — || July 1, 2005 || Kitt Peak || Spacewatch || — || align=right | 2.0 km || 
|-id=837 bgcolor=#E9E9E9
| 360837 ||  || — || July 3, 2005 || Mount Lemmon || Mount Lemmon Survey || — || align=right | 1.7 km || 
|-id=838 bgcolor=#E9E9E9
| 360838 ||  || — || July 3, 2005 || Mount Lemmon || Mount Lemmon Survey || — || align=right | 1.7 km || 
|-id=839 bgcolor=#E9E9E9
| 360839 ||  || — || July 2, 2005 || Kitt Peak || Spacewatch || — || align=right | 1.9 km || 
|-id=840 bgcolor=#E9E9E9
| 360840 ||  || — || July 5, 2005 || Kitt Peak || Spacewatch || HOF || align=right | 3.0 km || 
|-id=841 bgcolor=#E9E9E9
| 360841 ||  || — || July 11, 2005 || Bergisch Gladbach || W. Bickel || — || align=right | 2.5 km || 
|-id=842 bgcolor=#E9E9E9
| 360842 ||  || — || July 3, 2005 || Mount Lemmon || Mount Lemmon Survey || NEM || align=right | 2.2 km || 
|-id=843 bgcolor=#E9E9E9
| 360843 ||  || — || July 3, 2005 || Palomar || NEAT || JUN || align=right | 1.2 km || 
|-id=844 bgcolor=#d6d6d6
| 360844 ||  || — || July 30, 2005 || Palomar || NEAT || — || align=right | 3.1 km || 
|-id=845 bgcolor=#E9E9E9
| 360845 ||  || — || July 31, 2005 || Palomar || NEAT || — || align=right | 2.1 km || 
|-id=846 bgcolor=#d6d6d6
| 360846 ||  || — || July 29, 2005 || Palomar || NEAT || — || align=right | 3.3 km || 
|-id=847 bgcolor=#E9E9E9
| 360847 ||  || — || August 6, 2005 || Palomar || NEAT || — || align=right | 2.9 km || 
|-id=848 bgcolor=#E9E9E9
| 360848 ||  || — || August 25, 2005 || Palomar || NEAT || — || align=right | 3.0 km || 
|-id=849 bgcolor=#E9E9E9
| 360849 ||  || — || August 25, 2005 || Palomar || NEAT || — || align=right | 2.0 km || 
|-id=850 bgcolor=#E9E9E9
| 360850 ||  || — || August 27, 2005 || Anderson Mesa || LONEOS || — || align=right | 2.9 km || 
|-id=851 bgcolor=#E9E9E9
| 360851 ||  || — || August 26, 2005 || Anderson Mesa || LONEOS || — || align=right | 2.9 km || 
|-id=852 bgcolor=#E9E9E9
| 360852 ||  || — || August 26, 2005 || Palomar || NEAT || — || align=right | 2.0 km || 
|-id=853 bgcolor=#E9E9E9
| 360853 ||  || — || August 26, 2005 || Palomar || NEAT || — || align=right | 2.4 km || 
|-id=854 bgcolor=#E9E9E9
| 360854 ||  || — || August 27, 2005 || Anderson Mesa || LONEOS || — || align=right | 2.8 km || 
|-id=855 bgcolor=#d6d6d6
| 360855 ||  || — || August 29, 2005 || Anderson Mesa || LONEOS || — || align=right | 3.7 km || 
|-id=856 bgcolor=#E9E9E9
| 360856 ||  || — || August 28, 2005 || Anderson Mesa || LONEOS || — || align=right | 3.7 km || 
|-id=857 bgcolor=#E9E9E9
| 360857 ||  || — || August 28, 2005 || Kitt Peak || Spacewatch || — || align=right | 1.5 km || 
|-id=858 bgcolor=#d6d6d6
| 360858 ||  || — || August 28, 2005 || Kitt Peak || Spacewatch || — || align=right | 2.3 km || 
|-id=859 bgcolor=#E9E9E9
| 360859 ||  || — || August 28, 2005 || Kitt Peak || Spacewatch || — || align=right | 3.2 km || 
|-id=860 bgcolor=#E9E9E9
| 360860 ||  || — || August 28, 2005 || Kitt Peak || Spacewatch || — || align=right | 2.4 km || 
|-id=861 bgcolor=#d6d6d6
| 360861 ||  || — || August 28, 2005 || Kitt Peak || Spacewatch || KOR || align=right | 1.5 km || 
|-id=862 bgcolor=#E9E9E9
| 360862 ||  || — || August 27, 2005 || Palomar || NEAT || — || align=right | 1.8 km || 
|-id=863 bgcolor=#d6d6d6
| 360863 ||  || — || August 28, 2005 || Kitt Peak || Spacewatch || — || align=right | 2.3 km || 
|-id=864 bgcolor=#E9E9E9
| 360864 ||  || — || August 27, 2005 || Palomar || NEAT || — || align=right | 2.7 km || 
|-id=865 bgcolor=#E9E9E9
| 360865 ||  || — || August 31, 2005 || Palomar || NEAT || — || align=right | 3.6 km || 
|-id=866 bgcolor=#E9E9E9
| 360866 ||  || — || September 7, 2005 || Campo Catino || CAOS || — || align=right | 2.8 km || 
|-id=867 bgcolor=#d6d6d6
| 360867 ||  || — || September 12, 2005 || Junk Bond || D. Healy || KOR || align=right | 1.8 km || 
|-id=868 bgcolor=#E9E9E9
| 360868 ||  || — || September 9, 2005 || Socorro || LINEAR || — || align=right | 1.8 km || 
|-id=869 bgcolor=#d6d6d6
| 360869 ||  || — || September 14, 2005 || Apache Point || A. C. Becker || — || align=right | 2.5 km || 
|-id=870 bgcolor=#E9E9E9
| 360870 ||  || — || September 20, 2005 || Reedy Creek || J. Broughton || — || align=right | 3.1 km || 
|-id=871 bgcolor=#d6d6d6
| 360871 ||  || — || September 26, 2005 || Kitt Peak || Spacewatch || EOS || align=right | 1.8 km || 
|-id=872 bgcolor=#E9E9E9
| 360872 ||  || — || September 24, 2005 || Anderson Mesa || LONEOS || GEF || align=right | 1.8 km || 
|-id=873 bgcolor=#d6d6d6
| 360873 ||  || — || September 24, 2005 || Anderson Mesa || LONEOS || JLI || align=right | 3.6 km || 
|-id=874 bgcolor=#d6d6d6
| 360874 ||  || — || September 23, 2005 || Kitt Peak || Spacewatch || — || align=right | 3.3 km || 
|-id=875 bgcolor=#d6d6d6
| 360875 ||  || — || September 23, 2005 || Kitt Peak || Spacewatch || — || align=right | 3.2 km || 
|-id=876 bgcolor=#d6d6d6
| 360876 ||  || — || September 24, 2005 || Kitt Peak || Spacewatch || 628 || align=right | 1.6 km || 
|-id=877 bgcolor=#E9E9E9
| 360877 ||  || — || August 30, 2005 || Palomar || NEAT || DOR || align=right | 3.3 km || 
|-id=878 bgcolor=#d6d6d6
| 360878 ||  || — || September 24, 2005 || Kitt Peak || Spacewatch || — || align=right | 3.3 km || 
|-id=879 bgcolor=#d6d6d6
| 360879 ||  || — || September 24, 2005 || Kitt Peak || Spacewatch || — || align=right | 3.3 km || 
|-id=880 bgcolor=#E9E9E9
| 360880 ||  || — || September 25, 2005 || Kitt Peak || Spacewatch || GEF || align=right | 1.6 km || 
|-id=881 bgcolor=#E9E9E9
| 360881 ||  || — || September 24, 2005 || Kitt Peak || Spacewatch || INO || align=right | 1.1 km || 
|-id=882 bgcolor=#d6d6d6
| 360882 ||  || — || September 24, 2005 || Kitt Peak || Spacewatch || — || align=right | 2.3 km || 
|-id=883 bgcolor=#d6d6d6
| 360883 ||  || — || September 24, 2005 || Kitt Peak || Spacewatch || — || align=right | 2.5 km || 
|-id=884 bgcolor=#d6d6d6
| 360884 ||  || — || September 24, 2005 || Kitt Peak || Spacewatch || TEL || align=right | 1.4 km || 
|-id=885 bgcolor=#d6d6d6
| 360885 ||  || — || September 24, 2005 || Kitt Peak || Spacewatch || BRA || align=right | 1.6 km || 
|-id=886 bgcolor=#d6d6d6
| 360886 ||  || — || September 24, 2005 || Kitt Peak || Spacewatch || — || align=right | 3.3 km || 
|-id=887 bgcolor=#d6d6d6
| 360887 ||  || — || September 25, 2005 || Kitt Peak || Spacewatch || — || align=right | 2.6 km || 
|-id=888 bgcolor=#d6d6d6
| 360888 ||  || — || September 25, 2005 || Kitt Peak || Spacewatch || — || align=right | 3.8 km || 
|-id=889 bgcolor=#d6d6d6
| 360889 ||  || — || September 26, 2005 || Kitt Peak || Spacewatch || — || align=right | 3.0 km || 
|-id=890 bgcolor=#d6d6d6
| 360890 ||  || — || September 26, 2005 || Kitt Peak || Spacewatch || — || align=right | 2.4 km || 
|-id=891 bgcolor=#d6d6d6
| 360891 ||  || — || September 29, 2005 || Kitt Peak || Spacewatch || BRA || align=right | 1.9 km || 
|-id=892 bgcolor=#E9E9E9
| 360892 ||  || — || September 29, 2005 || Kitt Peak || Spacewatch || — || align=right | 2.6 km || 
|-id=893 bgcolor=#E9E9E9
| 360893 ||  || — || September 25, 2005 || Kitt Peak || Spacewatch || — || align=right | 2.4 km || 
|-id=894 bgcolor=#d6d6d6
| 360894 ||  || — || September 25, 2005 || Kitt Peak || Spacewatch || — || align=right | 3.3 km || 
|-id=895 bgcolor=#d6d6d6
| 360895 ||  || — || September 25, 2005 || Kitt Peak || Spacewatch || — || align=right | 2.6 km || 
|-id=896 bgcolor=#d6d6d6
| 360896 ||  || — || September 25, 2005 || Kitt Peak || Spacewatch || — || align=right | 2.7 km || 
|-id=897 bgcolor=#d6d6d6
| 360897 ||  || — || September 25, 2005 || Kitt Peak || Spacewatch || FIR || align=right | 3.7 km || 
|-id=898 bgcolor=#d6d6d6
| 360898 ||  || — || September 25, 2005 || Kitt Peak || Spacewatch || EUP || align=right | 3.7 km || 
|-id=899 bgcolor=#d6d6d6
| 360899 ||  || — || September 26, 2005 || Kitt Peak || Spacewatch || — || align=right | 2.4 km || 
|-id=900 bgcolor=#d6d6d6
| 360900 ||  || — || September 26, 2005 || Kitt Peak || Spacewatch || — || align=right | 2.2 km || 
|}

360901–361000 

|-bgcolor=#d6d6d6
| 360901 ||  || — || September 29, 2005 || Kitt Peak || Spacewatch || — || align=right | 3.4 km || 
|-id=902 bgcolor=#d6d6d6
| 360902 ||  || — || September 29, 2005 || Kitt Peak || Spacewatch || SAN || align=right | 1.6 km || 
|-id=903 bgcolor=#d6d6d6
| 360903 ||  || — || September 29, 2005 || Kitt Peak || Spacewatch || — || align=right | 2.2 km || 
|-id=904 bgcolor=#d6d6d6
| 360904 ||  || — || September 29, 2005 || Anderson Mesa || LONEOS || — || align=right | 3.0 km || 
|-id=905 bgcolor=#d6d6d6
| 360905 ||  || — || September 25, 2005 || Kitt Peak || Spacewatch || BRA || align=right | 1.7 km || 
|-id=906 bgcolor=#d6d6d6
| 360906 ||  || — || September 30, 2005 || Kitt Peak || Spacewatch || KAR || align=right | 1.2 km || 
|-id=907 bgcolor=#E9E9E9
| 360907 ||  || — || May 9, 2004 || Kitt Peak || Spacewatch || HNA || align=right | 2.2 km || 
|-id=908 bgcolor=#d6d6d6
| 360908 ||  || — || September 24, 2005 || Kitt Peak || Spacewatch || — || align=right | 2.6 km || 
|-id=909 bgcolor=#d6d6d6
| 360909 ||  || — || September 30, 2005 || Mount Lemmon || Mount Lemmon Survey || KAR || align=right | 1.1 km || 
|-id=910 bgcolor=#d6d6d6
| 360910 ||  || — || September 23, 2005 || Anderson Mesa || LONEOS || — || align=right | 3.3 km || 
|-id=911 bgcolor=#d6d6d6
| 360911 ||  || — || September 29, 2005 || Kitt Peak || Spacewatch || — || align=right | 2.8 km || 
|-id=912 bgcolor=#d6d6d6
| 360912 ||  || — || September 30, 2005 || Mount Lemmon || Mount Lemmon Survey || — || align=right | 2.3 km || 
|-id=913 bgcolor=#d6d6d6
| 360913 ||  || — || September 30, 2005 || Kitt Peak || Spacewatch || — || align=right | 2.7 km || 
|-id=914 bgcolor=#d6d6d6
| 360914 ||  || — || September 23, 2005 || Kitt Peak || Spacewatch || EOS || align=right | 2.1 km || 
|-id=915 bgcolor=#d6d6d6
| 360915 ||  || — || September 21, 2005 || Apache Point || A. C. Becker || — || align=right | 2.5 km || 
|-id=916 bgcolor=#d6d6d6
| 360916 ||  || — || September 21, 2005 || Apache Point || A. C. Becker || — || align=right | 2.6 km || 
|-id=917 bgcolor=#d6d6d6
| 360917 ||  || — || September 25, 2005 || Kitt Peak || Spacewatch || — || align=right | 2.7 km || 
|-id=918 bgcolor=#E9E9E9
| 360918 ||  || — || October 3, 2005 || Catalina || CSS || — || align=right | 2.8 km || 
|-id=919 bgcolor=#d6d6d6
| 360919 ||  || — || October 1, 2005 || Kitt Peak || Spacewatch || — || align=right | 2.7 km || 
|-id=920 bgcolor=#d6d6d6
| 360920 ||  || — || October 1, 2005 || Kitt Peak || Spacewatch || EUP || align=right | 3.6 km || 
|-id=921 bgcolor=#d6d6d6
| 360921 ||  || — || October 1, 2005 || Mount Lemmon || Mount Lemmon Survey || — || align=right | 2.3 km || 
|-id=922 bgcolor=#d6d6d6
| 360922 ||  || — || October 1, 2005 || Mount Lemmon || Mount Lemmon Survey || — || align=right | 2.9 km || 
|-id=923 bgcolor=#d6d6d6
| 360923 ||  || — || October 1, 2005 || Catalina || CSS || — || align=right | 5.0 km || 
|-id=924 bgcolor=#d6d6d6
| 360924 ||  || — || October 5, 2005 || Kitt Peak || Spacewatch || — || align=right | 2.5 km || 
|-id=925 bgcolor=#E9E9E9
| 360925 ||  || — || October 1, 2005 || Catalina || CSS || — || align=right | 3.3 km || 
|-id=926 bgcolor=#d6d6d6
| 360926 ||  || — || October 4, 2005 || Mount Lemmon || Mount Lemmon Survey || — || align=right | 3.3 km || 
|-id=927 bgcolor=#d6d6d6
| 360927 ||  || — || October 3, 2005 || Catalina || CSS || EOS || align=right | 2.1 km || 
|-id=928 bgcolor=#d6d6d6
| 360928 ||  || — || October 4, 2005 || Mount Lemmon || Mount Lemmon Survey || — || align=right | 2.5 km || 
|-id=929 bgcolor=#d6d6d6
| 360929 ||  || — || October 8, 2005 || Socorro || LINEAR || — || align=right | 4.1 km || 
|-id=930 bgcolor=#d6d6d6
| 360930 ||  || — || September 29, 2005 || Kitt Peak || Spacewatch || — || align=right | 2.8 km || 
|-id=931 bgcolor=#d6d6d6
| 360931 ||  || — || October 7, 2005 || Kitt Peak || Spacewatch || — || align=right | 2.5 km || 
|-id=932 bgcolor=#d6d6d6
| 360932 ||  || — || October 8, 2005 || Kitt Peak || Spacewatch || EOS || align=right | 1.9 km || 
|-id=933 bgcolor=#E9E9E9
| 360933 ||  || — || October 6, 2005 || Anderson Mesa || LONEOS || — || align=right | 2.7 km || 
|-id=934 bgcolor=#d6d6d6
| 360934 ||  || — || September 29, 2005 || Kitt Peak || Spacewatch || — || align=right | 2.6 km || 
|-id=935 bgcolor=#d6d6d6
| 360935 ||  || — || October 8, 2005 || Kitt Peak || Spacewatch || — || align=right | 2.3 km || 
|-id=936 bgcolor=#d6d6d6
| 360936 ||  || — || October 9, 2005 || Kitt Peak || Spacewatch || — || align=right | 2.3 km || 
|-id=937 bgcolor=#d6d6d6
| 360937 ||  || — || October 9, 2005 || Kitt Peak || Spacewatch || EMA || align=right | 3.2 km || 
|-id=938 bgcolor=#d6d6d6
| 360938 ||  || — || October 10, 2005 || Kitt Peak || Spacewatch || — || align=right | 2.2 km || 
|-id=939 bgcolor=#d6d6d6
| 360939 ||  || — || October 12, 2005 || Kitt Peak || Spacewatch || — || align=right | 3.0 km || 
|-id=940 bgcolor=#d6d6d6
| 360940 ||  || — || October 7, 2005 || Mount Lemmon || Mount Lemmon Survey || — || align=right | 2.6 km || 
|-id=941 bgcolor=#d6d6d6
| 360941 ||  || — || October 22, 2005 || Kitt Peak || Spacewatch || TRE || align=right | 2.0 km || 
|-id=942 bgcolor=#d6d6d6
| 360942 ||  || — || October 22, 2005 || Kitt Peak || Spacewatch || — || align=right | 3.9 km || 
|-id=943 bgcolor=#d6d6d6
| 360943 ||  || — || October 24, 2005 || Kitt Peak || Spacewatch || SAN || align=right | 1.2 km || 
|-id=944 bgcolor=#d6d6d6
| 360944 ||  || — || October 24, 2005 || Kitt Peak || Spacewatch || — || align=right | 3.4 km || 
|-id=945 bgcolor=#d6d6d6
| 360945 ||  || — || October 24, 2005 || Kitt Peak || Spacewatch || — || align=right | 2.7 km || 
|-id=946 bgcolor=#d6d6d6
| 360946 ||  || — || October 24, 2005 || Kitt Peak || Spacewatch || EOS || align=right | 2.0 km || 
|-id=947 bgcolor=#E9E9E9
| 360947 ||  || — || October 23, 2005 || Catalina || CSS || — || align=right | 2.5 km || 
|-id=948 bgcolor=#E9E9E9
| 360948 ||  || — || October 23, 2005 || Catalina || CSS || — || align=right | 3.3 km || 
|-id=949 bgcolor=#d6d6d6
| 360949 ||  || — || October 23, 2005 || Catalina || CSS || — || align=right | 4.0 km || 
|-id=950 bgcolor=#d6d6d6
| 360950 ||  || — || October 22, 2005 || Catalina || CSS || — || align=right | 3.8 km || 
|-id=951 bgcolor=#d6d6d6
| 360951 ||  || — || October 3, 2005 || Palomar || NEAT || — || align=right | 4.1 km || 
|-id=952 bgcolor=#d6d6d6
| 360952 ||  || — || October 22, 2005 || Kitt Peak || Spacewatch || — || align=right | 2.5 km || 
|-id=953 bgcolor=#d6d6d6
| 360953 ||  || — || October 22, 2005 || Kitt Peak || Spacewatch || — || align=right | 3.3 km || 
|-id=954 bgcolor=#d6d6d6
| 360954 ||  || — || October 22, 2005 || Kitt Peak || Spacewatch || EOS || align=right | 1.4 km || 
|-id=955 bgcolor=#d6d6d6
| 360955 ||  || — || October 22, 2005 || Kitt Peak || Spacewatch || — || align=right | 4.4 km || 
|-id=956 bgcolor=#d6d6d6
| 360956 ||  || — || October 22, 2005 || Kitt Peak || Spacewatch || BRA || align=right | 1.7 km || 
|-id=957 bgcolor=#d6d6d6
| 360957 ||  || — || October 22, 2005 || Kitt Peak || Spacewatch || EOS || align=right | 2.3 km || 
|-id=958 bgcolor=#d6d6d6
| 360958 ||  || — || October 22, 2005 || Palomar || NEAT || — || align=right | 3.4 km || 
|-id=959 bgcolor=#d6d6d6
| 360959 ||  || — || October 22, 2005 || Kitt Peak || Spacewatch || — || align=right | 3.8 km || 
|-id=960 bgcolor=#d6d6d6
| 360960 ||  || — || October 23, 2005 || Catalina || CSS || — || align=right | 2.2 km || 
|-id=961 bgcolor=#d6d6d6
| 360961 ||  || — || October 24, 2005 || Kitt Peak || Spacewatch || — || align=right | 3.6 km || 
|-id=962 bgcolor=#d6d6d6
| 360962 ||  || — || October 24, 2005 || Kitt Peak || Spacewatch || KOR || align=right | 1.2 km || 
|-id=963 bgcolor=#d6d6d6
| 360963 ||  || — || October 25, 2005 || Catalina || CSS || — || align=right | 3.3 km || 
|-id=964 bgcolor=#d6d6d6
| 360964 ||  || — || October 24, 2005 || Kitt Peak || Spacewatch || — || align=right | 2.5 km || 
|-id=965 bgcolor=#d6d6d6
| 360965 ||  || — || October 24, 2005 || Kitt Peak || Spacewatch || — || align=right | 4.7 km || 
|-id=966 bgcolor=#d6d6d6
| 360966 ||  || — || October 24, 2005 || Kitt Peak || Spacewatch || — || align=right | 3.1 km || 
|-id=967 bgcolor=#d6d6d6
| 360967 ||  || — || October 25, 2005 || Kitt Peak || Spacewatch || HYG || align=right | 2.8 km || 
|-id=968 bgcolor=#d6d6d6
| 360968 ||  || — || October 24, 2005 || Kitt Peak || Spacewatch || — || align=right | 2.4 km || 
|-id=969 bgcolor=#d6d6d6
| 360969 ||  || — || October 27, 2005 || Mount Lemmon || Mount Lemmon Survey || — || align=right | 2.9 km || 
|-id=970 bgcolor=#d6d6d6
| 360970 ||  || — || October 27, 2005 || Kitt Peak || Spacewatch || — || align=right | 2.8 km || 
|-id=971 bgcolor=#d6d6d6
| 360971 ||  || — || October 27, 2005 || Kitt Peak || Spacewatch || THM || align=right | 2.6 km || 
|-id=972 bgcolor=#d6d6d6
| 360972 ||  || — || October 25, 2005 || Mount Lemmon || Mount Lemmon Survey || THM || align=right | 2.4 km || 
|-id=973 bgcolor=#d6d6d6
| 360973 ||  || — || October 25, 2005 || Kitt Peak || Spacewatch || CHA || align=right | 2.1 km || 
|-id=974 bgcolor=#d6d6d6
| 360974 ||  || — || October 28, 2005 || Mount Lemmon || Mount Lemmon Survey || THM || align=right | 2.3 km || 
|-id=975 bgcolor=#d6d6d6
| 360975 ||  || — || October 27, 2005 || Kitt Peak || Spacewatch || — || align=right | 4.2 km || 
|-id=976 bgcolor=#d6d6d6
| 360976 ||  || — || October 25, 2005 || Kitt Peak || Spacewatch || — || align=right | 2.2 km || 
|-id=977 bgcolor=#d6d6d6
| 360977 ||  || — || October 27, 2005 || Kitt Peak || Spacewatch || THM || align=right | 2.4 km || 
|-id=978 bgcolor=#d6d6d6
| 360978 ||  || — || October 28, 2005 || Mount Lemmon || Mount Lemmon Survey || — || align=right | 2.1 km || 
|-id=979 bgcolor=#d6d6d6
| 360979 ||  || — || October 24, 2005 || Kitt Peak || Spacewatch || EOS || align=right | 2.0 km || 
|-id=980 bgcolor=#d6d6d6
| 360980 ||  || — || October 26, 2005 || Kitt Peak || Spacewatch || EOS || align=right | 1.9 km || 
|-id=981 bgcolor=#d6d6d6
| 360981 ||  || — || October 27, 2005 || Mount Lemmon || Mount Lemmon Survey || — || align=right | 3.1 km || 
|-id=982 bgcolor=#d6d6d6
| 360982 ||  || — || October 27, 2005 || Mount Lemmon || Mount Lemmon Survey || — || align=right | 2.8 km || 
|-id=983 bgcolor=#d6d6d6
| 360983 ||  || — || October 27, 2005 || Kitt Peak || Spacewatch || — || align=right | 2.5 km || 
|-id=984 bgcolor=#d6d6d6
| 360984 ||  || — || October 12, 2005 || Kitt Peak || Spacewatch || — || align=right | 2.6 km || 
|-id=985 bgcolor=#d6d6d6
| 360985 ||  || — || October 29, 2005 || Kitt Peak || Spacewatch || EOS || align=right | 2.2 km || 
|-id=986 bgcolor=#E9E9E9
| 360986 ||  || — || October 29, 2005 || Mount Lemmon || Mount Lemmon Survey || — || align=right | 2.7 km || 
|-id=987 bgcolor=#d6d6d6
| 360987 ||  || — || October 31, 2005 || Kitt Peak || Spacewatch || — || align=right | 2.7 km || 
|-id=988 bgcolor=#d6d6d6
| 360988 ||  || — || October 29, 2005 || Kitt Peak || Spacewatch || EOS || align=right | 4.3 km || 
|-id=989 bgcolor=#d6d6d6
| 360989 ||  || — || October 29, 2005 || Catalina || CSS || — || align=right | 3.8 km || 
|-id=990 bgcolor=#d6d6d6
| 360990 ||  || — || October 27, 2005 || Mount Lemmon || Mount Lemmon Survey || THM || align=right | 1.9 km || 
|-id=991 bgcolor=#d6d6d6
| 360991 ||  || — || October 27, 2005 || Kitt Peak || Spacewatch || — || align=right | 3.0 km || 
|-id=992 bgcolor=#d6d6d6
| 360992 ||  || — || October 30, 2005 || Mount Lemmon || Mount Lemmon Survey || — || align=right | 3.1 km || 
|-id=993 bgcolor=#d6d6d6
| 360993 ||  || — || October 30, 2005 || Kitt Peak || Spacewatch || — || align=right | 2.3 km || 
|-id=994 bgcolor=#E9E9E9
| 360994 ||  || — || October 30, 2005 || Mount Lemmon || Mount Lemmon Survey || — || align=right | 2.1 km || 
|-id=995 bgcolor=#d6d6d6
| 360995 ||  || — || October 5, 2005 || Kitt Peak || Spacewatch || KOR || align=right | 1.3 km || 
|-id=996 bgcolor=#d6d6d6
| 360996 ||  || — || October 28, 2005 || Kitt Peak || Spacewatch || — || align=right | 2.3 km || 
|-id=997 bgcolor=#d6d6d6
| 360997 ||  || — || October 29, 2005 || Catalina || CSS || — || align=right | 3.4 km || 
|-id=998 bgcolor=#d6d6d6
| 360998 ||  || — || October 26, 2005 || Kitt Peak || Spacewatch || TIR || align=right | 3.4 km || 
|-id=999 bgcolor=#d6d6d6
| 360999 ||  || — || October 28, 2005 || Catalina || CSS || — || align=right | 3.7 km || 
|-id=000 bgcolor=#d6d6d6
| 361000 ||  || — || October 30, 2005 || Kitt Peak || Spacewatch || — || align=right | 4.4 km || 
|}

References

External links 
 Discovery Circumstances: Numbered Minor Planets (360001)–(365000) (IAU Minor Planet Center)

0360